

347001–347100 

|-bgcolor=#d6d6d6
| 347001 ||  || — || February 7, 2010 || WISE || WISE || URS || align=right | 4.2 km || 
|-id=002 bgcolor=#d6d6d6
| 347002 ||  || — || February 9, 2010 || WISE || WISE || — || align=right | 3.8 km || 
|-id=003 bgcolor=#d6d6d6
| 347003 ||  || — || February 9, 2010 || WISE || WISE || — || align=right | 5.7 km || 
|-id=004 bgcolor=#E9E9E9
| 347004 ||  || — || February 16, 2010 || Kitt Peak || Spacewatch || WIT || align=right | 1.2 km || 
|-id=005 bgcolor=#E9E9E9
| 347005 ||  || — || February 20, 2010 || Great Shefford || P. Birtwhistle || — || align=right | 2.5 km || 
|-id=006 bgcolor=#fefefe
| 347006 ||  || — || February 17, 2010 || Socorro || LINEAR || FLO || align=right data-sort-value="0.87" | 870 m || 
|-id=007 bgcolor=#d6d6d6
| 347007 ||  || — || February 18, 2010 || WISE || WISE || — || align=right | 4.8 km || 
|-id=008 bgcolor=#E9E9E9
| 347008 ||  || — || February 18, 2010 || WISE || WISE || ADE || align=right | 3.6 km || 
|-id=009 bgcolor=#d6d6d6
| 347009 ||  || — || February 19, 2010 || WISE || WISE || ALA || align=right | 6.6 km || 
|-id=010 bgcolor=#E9E9E9
| 347010 ||  || — || February 16, 2010 || Kitt Peak || Spacewatch || HOF || align=right | 3.2 km || 
|-id=011 bgcolor=#E9E9E9
| 347011 ||  || — || February 16, 2010 || Kitt Peak || Spacewatch || — || align=right | 1.7 km || 
|-id=012 bgcolor=#fefefe
| 347012 ||  || — || February 17, 2010 || Kitt Peak || Spacewatch || — || align=right | 1.4 km || 
|-id=013 bgcolor=#fefefe
| 347013 ||  || — || February 17, 2010 || Kitt Peak || Spacewatch || NYS || align=right data-sort-value="0.63" | 630 m || 
|-id=014 bgcolor=#d6d6d6
| 347014 ||  || — || February 22, 2010 || WISE || WISE || URS || align=right | 4.0 km || 
|-id=015 bgcolor=#E9E9E9
| 347015 ||  || — || February 18, 2010 || Mount Lemmon || Mount Lemmon Survey || — || align=right | 1.1 km || 
|-id=016 bgcolor=#E9E9E9
| 347016 ||  || — || February 16, 2010 || Haleakala || Pan-STARRS || — || align=right | 2.3 km || 
|-id=017 bgcolor=#E9E9E9
| 347017 ||  || — || February 16, 2010 || Haleakala || Pan-STARRS || — || align=right | 1.1 km || 
|-id=018 bgcolor=#fefefe
| 347018 ||  || — || February 19, 2010 || Kitt Peak || Spacewatch || — || align=right | 1.2 km || 
|-id=019 bgcolor=#E9E9E9
| 347019 ||  || — || March 4, 2010 || Kitt Peak || Spacewatch || — || align=right | 2.6 km || 
|-id=020 bgcolor=#E9E9E9
| 347020 ||  || — || March 7, 2010 || Taunus || S. Karge, E. Schwab || — || align=right | 1.2 km || 
|-id=021 bgcolor=#E9E9E9
| 347021 ||  || — || March 5, 2010 || Kitt Peak || Spacewatch || — || align=right | 1.5 km || 
|-id=022 bgcolor=#fefefe
| 347022 ||  || — || March 10, 2010 || La Sagra || OAM Obs. || — || align=right data-sort-value="0.94" | 940 m || 
|-id=023 bgcolor=#E9E9E9
| 347023 ||  || — || April 29, 2006 || Siding Spring || SSS || — || align=right | 2.0 km || 
|-id=024 bgcolor=#fefefe
| 347024 ||  || — || March 10, 2010 || La Sagra || OAM Obs. || — || align=right data-sort-value="0.98" | 980 m || 
|-id=025 bgcolor=#fefefe
| 347025 ||  || — || March 12, 2010 || Catalina || CSS || ERI || align=right | 1.6 km || 
|-id=026 bgcolor=#E9E9E9
| 347026 ||  || — || March 6, 2010 || Dauban || F. Kugel || — || align=right | 2.1 km || 
|-id=027 bgcolor=#E9E9E9
| 347027 ||  || — || March 13, 2010 || Črni Vrh || Črni Vrh || — || align=right | 3.7 km || 
|-id=028 bgcolor=#fefefe
| 347028 Važec ||  ||  || March 13, 2010 || LightBuckets || T. Vorobjov || NYS || align=right data-sort-value="0.54" | 540 m || 
|-id=029 bgcolor=#E9E9E9
| 347029 ||  || — || March 13, 2010 || Kitt Peak || Spacewatch || MRX || align=right data-sort-value="0.93" | 930 m || 
|-id=030 bgcolor=#E9E9E9
| 347030 ||  || — || March 12, 2010 || Kitt Peak || Spacewatch || — || align=right | 1.6 km || 
|-id=031 bgcolor=#E9E9E9
| 347031 ||  || — || March 12, 2010 || Kitt Peak || Spacewatch || HOF || align=right | 2.9 km || 
|-id=032 bgcolor=#d6d6d6
| 347032 ||  || — || March 12, 2010 || Kitt Peak || Spacewatch || — || align=right | 2.6 km || 
|-id=033 bgcolor=#E9E9E9
| 347033 ||  || — || October 3, 2003 || Kitt Peak || Spacewatch || — || align=right | 2.5 km || 
|-id=034 bgcolor=#E9E9E9
| 347034 ||  || — || March 14, 2010 || Kitt Peak || Spacewatch || — || align=right | 1.4 km || 
|-id=035 bgcolor=#E9E9E9
| 347035 ||  || — || February 20, 2002 || Kitt Peak || Spacewatch || — || align=right | 1.2 km || 
|-id=036 bgcolor=#fefefe
| 347036 ||  || — || March 14, 2010 || Mount Lemmon || Mount Lemmon Survey || MAS || align=right data-sort-value="0.69" | 690 m || 
|-id=037 bgcolor=#fefefe
| 347037 ||  || — || March 15, 2010 || Kitt Peak || Spacewatch || NYS || align=right data-sort-value="0.69" | 690 m || 
|-id=038 bgcolor=#E9E9E9
| 347038 ||  || — || March 7, 2010 || Črni Vrh || Črni Vrh || — || align=right | 1.5 km || 
|-id=039 bgcolor=#E9E9E9
| 347039 ||  || — || September 19, 2003 || Anderson Mesa || LONEOS || — || align=right | 3.3 km || 
|-id=040 bgcolor=#fefefe
| 347040 ||  || — || September 7, 2008 || Mount Lemmon || Mount Lemmon Survey || MAS || align=right data-sort-value="0.78" | 780 m || 
|-id=041 bgcolor=#E9E9E9
| 347041 ||  || — || March 15, 2010 || Kitt Peak || Spacewatch || DOR || align=right | 2.4 km || 
|-id=042 bgcolor=#E9E9E9
| 347042 ||  || — || October 28, 2008 || Kitt Peak || Spacewatch || — || align=right | 1.4 km || 
|-id=043 bgcolor=#E9E9E9
| 347043 ||  || — || January 17, 2005 || Kitt Peak || Spacewatch || — || align=right | 2.0 km || 
|-id=044 bgcolor=#E9E9E9
| 347044 ||  || — || October 22, 2003 || Kitt Peak || Spacewatch || — || align=right | 2.7 km || 
|-id=045 bgcolor=#E9E9E9
| 347045 ||  || — || March 15, 2010 || Kitt Peak || Spacewatch || — || align=right | 1.2 km || 
|-id=046 bgcolor=#E9E9E9
| 347046 ||  || — || March 10, 2010 || Purple Mountain || PMO NEO || KON || align=right | 3.3 km || 
|-id=047 bgcolor=#E9E9E9
| 347047 ||  || — || March 12, 2010 || Catalina || CSS || — || align=right | 2.4 km || 
|-id=048 bgcolor=#E9E9E9
| 347048 ||  || — || April 21, 2006 || Catalina || CSS || — || align=right | 2.9 km || 
|-id=049 bgcolor=#E9E9E9
| 347049 ||  || — || October 6, 2008 || Mount Lemmon || Mount Lemmon Survey || — || align=right | 1.2 km || 
|-id=050 bgcolor=#fefefe
| 347050 ||  || — || March 15, 2010 || Catalina || CSS || — || align=right | 1.3 km || 
|-id=051 bgcolor=#E9E9E9
| 347051 ||  || — || March 13, 2010 || Kitt Peak || Spacewatch || — || align=right | 2.7 km || 
|-id=052 bgcolor=#E9E9E9
| 347052 ||  || — || March 13, 2010 || Mount Lemmon || Mount Lemmon Survey || GEF || align=right | 1.2 km || 
|-id=053 bgcolor=#E9E9E9
| 347053 ||  || — || March 12, 2010 || Kitt Peak || Spacewatch || — || align=right | 2.1 km || 
|-id=054 bgcolor=#d6d6d6
| 347054 ||  || — || March 13, 2010 || Catalina || CSS || TIR || align=right | 2.4 km || 
|-id=055 bgcolor=#E9E9E9
| 347055 ||  || — || March 15, 2010 || Mount Lemmon || Mount Lemmon Survey || — || align=right | 2.8 km || 
|-id=056 bgcolor=#E9E9E9
| 347056 ||  || — || March 14, 2010 || La Sagra || OAM Obs. || — || align=right | 1.6 km || 
|-id=057 bgcolor=#d6d6d6
| 347057 ||  || — || December 21, 2008 || Mount Lemmon || Mount Lemmon Survey || — || align=right | 2.1 km || 
|-id=058 bgcolor=#d6d6d6
| 347058 ||  || — || March 15, 2010 || Catalina || CSS || — || align=right | 2.7 km || 
|-id=059 bgcolor=#E9E9E9
| 347059 ||  || — || March 16, 2010 || Mount Lemmon || Mount Lemmon Survey || — || align=right | 2.3 km || 
|-id=060 bgcolor=#E9E9E9
| 347060 ||  || — || March 16, 2010 || Mount Lemmon || Mount Lemmon Survey || EUN || align=right | 1.6 km || 
|-id=061 bgcolor=#E9E9E9
| 347061 ||  || — || March 16, 2010 || Mount Lemmon || Mount Lemmon Survey || — || align=right | 1.0 km || 
|-id=062 bgcolor=#E9E9E9
| 347062 ||  || — || April 27, 2006 || Kitt Peak || Spacewatch || — || align=right | 1.6 km || 
|-id=063 bgcolor=#E9E9E9
| 347063 ||  || — || March 18, 2010 || Mount Lemmon || Mount Lemmon Survey || MRX || align=right | 1.3 km || 
|-id=064 bgcolor=#E9E9E9
| 347064 ||  || — || March 20, 2010 || Mount Lemmon || Mount Lemmon Survey || — || align=right | 2.0 km || 
|-id=065 bgcolor=#d6d6d6
| 347065 ||  || — || March 16, 2010 || Catalina || CSS || TIR || align=right | 2.9 km || 
|-id=066 bgcolor=#d6d6d6
| 347066 ||  || — || March 17, 2010 || Kitt Peak || Spacewatch || HYG || align=right | 2.7 km || 
|-id=067 bgcolor=#E9E9E9
| 347067 ||  || — || March 18, 2010 || Kitt Peak || Spacewatch || — || align=right | 2.1 km || 
|-id=068 bgcolor=#E9E9E9
| 347068 ||  || — || February 2, 2005 || Kitt Peak || Spacewatch || — || align=right | 2.1 km || 
|-id=069 bgcolor=#d6d6d6
| 347069 ||  || — || March 21, 2010 || Kitt Peak || Spacewatch || — || align=right | 3.6 km || 
|-id=070 bgcolor=#E9E9E9
| 347070 ||  || — || April 30, 2006 || Catalina || CSS || RAF || align=right | 1.1 km || 
|-id=071 bgcolor=#E9E9E9
| 347071 ||  || — || March 21, 2010 || Catalina || CSS || — || align=right | 1.4 km || 
|-id=072 bgcolor=#E9E9E9
| 347072 ||  || — || March 19, 2010 || Mount Lemmon || Mount Lemmon Survey || — || align=right | 3.6 km || 
|-id=073 bgcolor=#E9E9E9
| 347073 ||  || — || March 19, 2010 || Kitt Peak || Spacewatch || — || align=right | 1.6 km || 
|-id=074 bgcolor=#E9E9E9
| 347074 ||  || — || September 30, 2003 || Kitt Peak || Spacewatch || — || align=right | 1.3 km || 
|-id=075 bgcolor=#E9E9E9
| 347075 ||  || — || February 24, 2006 || Kitt Peak || Spacewatch || — || align=right | 2.8 km || 
|-id=076 bgcolor=#E9E9E9
| 347076 ||  || — || April 4, 2010 || Kitt Peak || Spacewatch || — || align=right | 1.7 km || 
|-id=077 bgcolor=#E9E9E9
| 347077 ||  || — || April 5, 2010 || Catalina || CSS || ADE || align=right | 2.8 km || 
|-id=078 bgcolor=#E9E9E9
| 347078 ||  || — || April 4, 2010 || Kitt Peak || Spacewatch || — || align=right | 1.4 km || 
|-id=079 bgcolor=#d6d6d6
| 347079 ||  || — || January 20, 2010 || WISE || WISE || — || align=right | 4.6 km || 
|-id=080 bgcolor=#E9E9E9
| 347080 ||  || — || April 8, 2010 || Črni Vrh || Črni Vrh || — || align=right | 2.7 km || 
|-id=081 bgcolor=#E9E9E9
| 347081 ||  || — || November 19, 2003 || Kitt Peak || Spacewatch || NEM || align=right | 2.7 km || 
|-id=082 bgcolor=#fefefe
| 347082 ||  || — || April 6, 2010 || WISE || WISE || FLO || align=right | 1.3 km || 
|-id=083 bgcolor=#E9E9E9
| 347083 ||  || — || April 8, 2010 || XuYi || PMO NEO || — || align=right | 2.6 km || 
|-id=084 bgcolor=#E9E9E9
| 347084 ||  || — || April 4, 2010 || Kitt Peak || Spacewatch || AST || align=right | 1.7 km || 
|-id=085 bgcolor=#d6d6d6
| 347085 ||  || — || April 5, 2010 || Kitt Peak || Spacewatch || EOS || align=right | 1.9 km || 
|-id=086 bgcolor=#E9E9E9
| 347086 ||  || — || April 7, 2010 || Kitt Peak || Spacewatch || WIT || align=right | 1.4 km || 
|-id=087 bgcolor=#d6d6d6
| 347087 ||  || — || March 21, 2010 || Kitt Peak || Spacewatch || HYG || align=right | 3.1 km || 
|-id=088 bgcolor=#E9E9E9
| 347088 ||  || — || September 13, 2007 || Mount Lemmon || Mount Lemmon Survey || AEO || align=right | 1.6 km || 
|-id=089 bgcolor=#E9E9E9
| 347089 ||  || — || April 10, 2010 || Kitt Peak || Spacewatch || MIS || align=right | 1.9 km || 
|-id=090 bgcolor=#E9E9E9
| 347090 ||  || — || April 11, 2010 || Mount Lemmon || Mount Lemmon Survey || — || align=right | 1.5 km || 
|-id=091 bgcolor=#E9E9E9
| 347091 ||  || — || April 14, 2010 || Kitt Peak || Spacewatch || — || align=right | 2.0 km || 
|-id=092 bgcolor=#d6d6d6
| 347092 ||  || — || April 10, 2010 || Mount Lemmon || Mount Lemmon Survey || — || align=right | 4.0 km || 
|-id=093 bgcolor=#d6d6d6
| 347093 ||  || — || April 4, 2010 || Kitt Peak || Spacewatch || — || align=right | 3.2 km || 
|-id=094 bgcolor=#d6d6d6
| 347094 ||  || — || April 6, 2005 || Mount Lemmon || Mount Lemmon Survey || — || align=right | 2.3 km || 
|-id=095 bgcolor=#E9E9E9
| 347095 ||  || — || January 15, 2005 || Kitt Peak || Spacewatch || — || align=right | 1.5 km || 
|-id=096 bgcolor=#d6d6d6
| 347096 ||  || — || April 11, 2010 || Mount Lemmon || Mount Lemmon Survey || KOR || align=right | 1.4 km || 
|-id=097 bgcolor=#E9E9E9
| 347097 ||  || — || December 5, 2008 || Kitt Peak || Spacewatch || — || align=right | 2.4 km || 
|-id=098 bgcolor=#C2FFFF
| 347098 ||  || — || February 9, 2007 || Kitt Peak || Spacewatch || L5 || align=right | 12 km || 
|-id=099 bgcolor=#C2FFFF
| 347099 ||  || — || April 22, 2010 || WISE || WISE || L5010 || align=right | 9.3 km || 
|-id=100 bgcolor=#E9E9E9
| 347100 ||  || — || April 25, 2010 || Mount Lemmon || Mount Lemmon Survey || — || align=right | 2.0 km || 
|}

347101–347200 

|-bgcolor=#d6d6d6
| 347101 ||  || — || April 12, 2004 || Siding Spring || SSS || — || align=right | 3.6 km || 
|-id=102 bgcolor=#fefefe
| 347102 ||  || — || April 20, 2010 || Kitt Peak || Spacewatch || NYS || align=right data-sort-value="0.76" | 760 m || 
|-id=103 bgcolor=#d6d6d6
| 347103 ||  || — || April 20, 2010 || Kitt Peak || Spacewatch || — || align=right | 4.1 km || 
|-id=104 bgcolor=#d6d6d6
| 347104 ||  || — || April 12, 2004 || Kitt Peak || Spacewatch || — || align=right | 2.9 km || 
|-id=105 bgcolor=#E9E9E9
| 347105 ||  || — || October 1, 2008 || Mount Lemmon || Mount Lemmon Survey || — || align=right | 1.4 km || 
|-id=106 bgcolor=#E9E9E9
| 347106 ||  || — || April 16, 2010 || Siding Spring || SSS || MIT || align=right | 3.3 km || 
|-id=107 bgcolor=#d6d6d6
| 347107 ||  || — || October 8, 2007 || Mount Lemmon || Mount Lemmon Survey || K-2 || align=right | 1.3 km || 
|-id=108 bgcolor=#d6d6d6
| 347108 ||  || — || September 18, 2006 || Catalina || CSS || — || align=right | 3.9 km || 
|-id=109 bgcolor=#d6d6d6
| 347109 ||  || — || May 3, 2010 || Kitt Peak || Spacewatch || — || align=right | 2.5 km || 
|-id=110 bgcolor=#d6d6d6
| 347110 ||  || — || April 17, 2010 || Kitt Peak || Spacewatch || — || align=right | 3.7 km || 
|-id=111 bgcolor=#d6d6d6
| 347111 ||  || — || May 15, 2005 || Palomar || NEAT || — || align=right | 2.9 km || 
|-id=112 bgcolor=#d6d6d6
| 347112 ||  || — || September 25, 2006 || Kitt Peak || Spacewatch || VER || align=right | 2.8 km || 
|-id=113 bgcolor=#d6d6d6
| 347113 ||  || — || May 8, 2010 || Mount Lemmon || Mount Lemmon Survey || — || align=right | 2.6 km || 
|-id=114 bgcolor=#E9E9E9
| 347114 ||  || — || November 17, 1998 || Kitt Peak || Spacewatch || — || align=right | 2.6 km || 
|-id=115 bgcolor=#d6d6d6
| 347115 ||  || — || May 11, 2010 || Mount Lemmon || Mount Lemmon Survey || — || align=right | 3.6 km || 
|-id=116 bgcolor=#d6d6d6
| 347116 ||  || — || May 12, 2010 || Kitt Peak || Spacewatch || — || align=right | 3.4 km || 
|-id=117 bgcolor=#E9E9E9
| 347117 ||  || — || May 4, 2010 || Catalina || CSS || MAR || align=right | 2.2 km || 
|-id=118 bgcolor=#E9E9E9
| 347118 ||  || — || May 12, 2010 || Nogales || Tenagra II Obs. || JUN || align=right | 1.5 km || 
|-id=119 bgcolor=#E9E9E9
| 347119 ||  || — || May 4, 2010 || Catalina || CSS || — || align=right | 2.3 km || 
|-id=120 bgcolor=#E9E9E9
| 347120 ||  || — || May 13, 2010 || Kitt Peak || Spacewatch || — || align=right | 1.5 km || 
|-id=121 bgcolor=#E9E9E9
| 347121 ||  || — || May 7, 2010 || Mount Lemmon || Mount Lemmon Survey || — || align=right | 2.2 km || 
|-id=122 bgcolor=#E9E9E9
| 347122 ||  || — || February 17, 2001 || Haleakala || NEAT || — || align=right | 2.2 km || 
|-id=123 bgcolor=#d6d6d6
| 347123 ||  || — || November 7, 2007 || Kitt Peak || Spacewatch || — || align=right | 3.7 km || 
|-id=124 bgcolor=#E9E9E9
| 347124 ||  || — || April 1, 2005 || Kitt Peak || Spacewatch || — || align=right | 2.3 km || 
|-id=125 bgcolor=#d6d6d6
| 347125 ||  || — || May 9, 2010 || Mount Lemmon || Mount Lemmon Survey || EOS || align=right | 1.9 km || 
|-id=126 bgcolor=#d6d6d6
| 347126 ||  || — || May 12, 2010 || Kitt Peak || Spacewatch || URS || align=right | 4.3 km || 
|-id=127 bgcolor=#d6d6d6
| 347127 ||  || — || May 11, 2010 || Mount Lemmon || Mount Lemmon Survey || — || align=right | 4.5 km || 
|-id=128 bgcolor=#d6d6d6
| 347128 ||  || — || May 13, 2010 || Kitt Peak || Spacewatch || — || align=right | 3.4 km || 
|-id=129 bgcolor=#d6d6d6
| 347129 ||  || — || May 14, 2010 || Mount Lemmon || Mount Lemmon Survey || MEL || align=right | 4.0 km || 
|-id=130 bgcolor=#d6d6d6
| 347130 ||  || — || May 17, 2010 || Kitt Peak || Spacewatch || — || align=right | 5.1 km || 
|-id=131 bgcolor=#E9E9E9
| 347131 ||  || — || May 24, 2010 || Mount Lemmon || Mount Lemmon Survey || HNS || align=right | 1.7 km || 
|-id=132 bgcolor=#E9E9E9
| 347132 ||  || — || June 6, 2010 || WISE || WISE || — || align=right | 3.1 km || 
|-id=133 bgcolor=#fefefe
| 347133 ||  || — || June 10, 2010 || WISE || WISE || — || align=right | 1.5 km || 
|-id=134 bgcolor=#C2FFFF
| 347134 ||  || — || February 2, 2006 || Mount Lemmon || Mount Lemmon Survey || L5 || align=right | 10 km || 
|-id=135 bgcolor=#E9E9E9
| 347135 ||  || — || July 3, 2010 || WISE || WISE || — || align=right | 2.4 km || 
|-id=136 bgcolor=#E9E9E9
| 347136 ||  || — || July 20, 2010 || WISE || WISE || — || align=right | 3.1 km || 
|-id=137 bgcolor=#d6d6d6
| 347137 ||  || — || July 22, 2010 || WISE || WISE || MEL || align=right | 4.3 km || 
|-id=138 bgcolor=#d6d6d6
| 347138 ||  || — || July 22, 2010 || WISE || WISE || — || align=right | 4.6 km || 
|-id=139 bgcolor=#d6d6d6
| 347139 ||  || — || April 22, 2004 || Kitt Peak || Spacewatch || — || align=right | 4.9 km || 
|-id=140 bgcolor=#d6d6d6
| 347140 ||  || — || July 25, 2010 || WISE || WISE || — || align=right | 5.4 km || 
|-id=141 bgcolor=#E9E9E9
| 347141 ||  || — || December 17, 2003 || Kitt Peak || Spacewatch || — || align=right | 3.7 km || 
|-id=142 bgcolor=#E9E9E9
| 347142 ||  || — || December 30, 2008 || Mount Lemmon || Mount Lemmon Survey || HOF || align=right | 2.6 km || 
|-id=143 bgcolor=#E9E9E9
| 347143 ||  || — || July 27, 2010 || WISE || WISE || — || align=right | 4.2 km || 
|-id=144 bgcolor=#d6d6d6
| 347144 ||  || — || July 28, 2010 || WISE || WISE || — || align=right | 3.4 km || 
|-id=145 bgcolor=#E9E9E9
| 347145 ||  || — || July 31, 2010 || WISE || WISE || — || align=right | 2.6 km || 
|-id=146 bgcolor=#d6d6d6
| 347146 ||  || — || July 31, 2010 || WISE || WISE || — || align=right | 4.7 km || 
|-id=147 bgcolor=#E9E9E9
| 347147 ||  || — || September 28, 2006 || Kitt Peak || Spacewatch || — || align=right | 1.0 km || 
|-id=148 bgcolor=#C2FFFF
| 347148 ||  || — || October 17, 2009 || Catalina || CSS || L4ERY || align=right | 13 km || 
|-id=149 bgcolor=#FA8072
| 347149 ||  || — || July 3, 2005 || Siding Spring || SSS || — || align=right | 1.3 km || 
|-id=150 bgcolor=#fefefe
| 347150 ||  || — || September 6, 2004 || Siding Spring || SSS || H || align=right data-sort-value="0.73" | 730 m || 
|-id=151 bgcolor=#fefefe
| 347151 ||  || — || September 16, 2009 || Kitt Peak || Spacewatch || V || align=right data-sort-value="0.75" | 750 m || 
|-id=152 bgcolor=#E9E9E9
| 347152 ||  || — || March 16, 2007 || Kitt Peak || Spacewatch || — || align=right | 3.1 km || 
|-id=153 bgcolor=#fefefe
| 347153 ||  || — || November 18, 1995 || Kitt Peak || Spacewatch || FLO || align=right data-sort-value="0.66" | 660 m || 
|-id=154 bgcolor=#E9E9E9
| 347154 ||  || — || March 2, 2011 || Mount Lemmon || Mount Lemmon Survey || — || align=right | 2.2 km || 
|-id=155 bgcolor=#E9E9E9
| 347155 ||  || — || October 11, 2004 || Kitt Peak || Spacewatch || — || align=right | 1.4 km || 
|-id=156 bgcolor=#E9E9E9
| 347156 ||  || — || August 7, 2004 || Siding Spring || SSS || — || align=right | 1.3 km || 
|-id=157 bgcolor=#E9E9E9
| 347157 ||  || — || January 28, 2006 || Mount Lemmon || Mount Lemmon Survey || — || align=right | 2.6 km || 
|-id=158 bgcolor=#E9E9E9
| 347158 ||  || — || January 10, 2002 || Palomar || NEAT || — || align=right | 2.1 km || 
|-id=159 bgcolor=#fefefe
| 347159 ||  || — || October 1, 2005 || Mount Lemmon || Mount Lemmon Survey || NYS || align=right data-sort-value="0.96" | 960 m || 
|-id=160 bgcolor=#E9E9E9
| 347160 ||  || — || March 26, 2007 || Mount Lemmon || Mount Lemmon Survey || — || align=right | 1.3 km || 
|-id=161 bgcolor=#fefefe
| 347161 ||  || — || February 6, 2007 || Kitt Peak || Spacewatch || NYS || align=right data-sort-value="0.73" | 730 m || 
|-id=162 bgcolor=#fefefe
| 347162 ||  || — || April 8, 1995 || Kitt Peak || T. J. Balonek || — || align=right data-sort-value="0.73" | 730 m || 
|-id=163 bgcolor=#fefefe
| 347163 ||  || — || April 25, 2004 || Catalina || CSS || — || align=right data-sort-value="0.85" | 850 m || 
|-id=164 bgcolor=#E9E9E9
| 347164 ||  || — || April 12, 2007 || Siding Spring || SSS || — || align=right | 1.6 km || 
|-id=165 bgcolor=#fefefe
| 347165 ||  || — || September 6, 2008 || Catalina || CSS || — || align=right data-sort-value="0.97" | 970 m || 
|-id=166 bgcolor=#fefefe
| 347166 ||  || — || May 15, 2001 || Haleakala || NEAT || — || align=right data-sort-value="0.83" | 830 m || 
|-id=167 bgcolor=#fefefe
| 347167 ||  || — || August 4, 2005 || Palomar || NEAT || — || align=right data-sort-value="0.80" | 800 m || 
|-id=168 bgcolor=#E9E9E9
| 347168 ||  || — || May 12, 2007 || Kitt Peak || Spacewatch || — || align=right | 1.1 km || 
|-id=169 bgcolor=#d6d6d6
| 347169 ||  || — || October 14, 2001 || Apache Point || SDSS || — || align=right | 3.2 km || 
|-id=170 bgcolor=#d6d6d6
| 347170 ||  || — || September 4, 2007 || Mount Lemmon || Mount Lemmon Survey || EOS || align=right | 2.2 km || 
|-id=171 bgcolor=#fefefe
| 347171 ||  || — || August 24, 2008 || Kitt Peak || Spacewatch || — || align=right data-sort-value="0.78" | 780 m || 
|-id=172 bgcolor=#fefefe
| 347172 ||  || — || August 27, 2008 || Hibiscus || N. Teamo || MAS || align=right data-sort-value="0.70" | 700 m || 
|-id=173 bgcolor=#fefefe
| 347173 ||  || — || July 30, 2008 || Mount Lemmon || Mount Lemmon Survey || NYS || align=right data-sort-value="0.66" | 660 m || 
|-id=174 bgcolor=#fefefe
| 347174 ||  || — || July 28, 2005 || Palomar || NEAT || V || align=right data-sort-value="0.76" | 760 m || 
|-id=175 bgcolor=#fefefe
| 347175 ||  || — || February 8, 2007 || Mount Lemmon || Mount Lemmon Survey || MAS || align=right data-sort-value="0.82" | 820 m || 
|-id=176 bgcolor=#fefefe
| 347176 ||  || — || October 17, 2009 || Mount Lemmon || Mount Lemmon Survey || V || align=right data-sort-value="0.85" | 850 m || 
|-id=177 bgcolor=#fefefe
| 347177 ||  || — || October 7, 2005 || Anderson Mesa || LONEOS || — || align=right | 1.0 km || 
|-id=178 bgcolor=#E9E9E9
| 347178 ||  || — || January 14, 2011 || Kitt Peak || Spacewatch || — || align=right | 2.2 km || 
|-id=179 bgcolor=#fefefe
| 347179 ||  || — || December 11, 2009 || Mount Lemmon || Mount Lemmon Survey || FLO || align=right data-sort-value="0.69" | 690 m || 
|-id=180 bgcolor=#fefefe
| 347180 ||  || — || March 26, 2003 || Apache Point || SDSS || H || align=right data-sort-value="0.89" | 890 m || 
|-id=181 bgcolor=#fefefe
| 347181 ||  || — || October 24, 2009 || Kitt Peak || Spacewatch || V || align=right data-sort-value="0.77" | 770 m || 
|-id=182 bgcolor=#fefefe
| 347182 ||  || — || May 20, 2006 || Kitt Peak || Spacewatch || H || align=right data-sort-value="0.67" | 670 m || 
|-id=183 bgcolor=#fefefe
| 347183 ||  || — || October 4, 2004 || Kitt Peak || Spacewatch || H || align=right data-sort-value="0.60" | 600 m || 
|-id=184 bgcolor=#fefefe
| 347184 ||  || — || November 9, 2009 || Kitt Peak || Spacewatch || FLO || align=right data-sort-value="0.83" | 830 m || 
|-id=185 bgcolor=#fefefe
| 347185 ||  || — || May 16, 2004 || Siding Spring || SSS || NYS || align=right data-sort-value="0.76" | 760 m || 
|-id=186 bgcolor=#d6d6d6
| 347186 ||  || — || October 29, 2008 || Mount Lemmon || Mount Lemmon Survey || — || align=right | 3.6 km || 
|-id=187 bgcolor=#fefefe
| 347187 ||  || — || March 17, 2004 || Kitt Peak || Spacewatch || — || align=right data-sort-value="0.75" | 750 m || 
|-id=188 bgcolor=#fefefe
| 347188 ||  || — || August 13, 2002 || Socorro || LINEAR || — || align=right data-sort-value="0.87" | 870 m || 
|-id=189 bgcolor=#E9E9E9
| 347189 ||  || — || March 24, 2006 || Anderson Mesa || LONEOS || — || align=right | 3.7 km || 
|-id=190 bgcolor=#fefefe
| 347190 ||  || — || November 3, 2005 || Mount Lemmon || Mount Lemmon Survey || V || align=right data-sort-value="0.94" | 940 m || 
|-id=191 bgcolor=#fefefe
| 347191 ||  || — || December 13, 2006 || Kitt Peak || Spacewatch || NYS || align=right data-sort-value="0.65" | 650 m || 
|-id=192 bgcolor=#fefefe
| 347192 ||  || — || January 10, 2007 || Kitt Peak || Spacewatch || — || align=right data-sort-value="0.69" | 690 m || 
|-id=193 bgcolor=#d6d6d6
| 347193 ||  || — || September 8, 2007 || Costitx || OAM Obs. || EOS || align=right | 2.7 km || 
|-id=194 bgcolor=#fefefe
| 347194 ||  || — || March 17, 2004 || Socorro || LINEAR || FLO || align=right data-sort-value="0.83" | 830 m || 
|-id=195 bgcolor=#fefefe
| 347195 ||  || — || November 14, 2007 || Mount Lemmon || Mount Lemmon Survey || H || align=right data-sort-value="0.89" | 890 m || 
|-id=196 bgcolor=#fefefe
| 347196 ||  || — || November 14, 2007 || Mount Lemmon || Mount Lemmon Survey || H || align=right data-sort-value="0.89" | 890 m || 
|-id=197 bgcolor=#fefefe
| 347197 ||  || — || March 11, 2007 || Kitt Peak || Spacewatch || — || align=right | 1.2 km || 
|-id=198 bgcolor=#fefefe
| 347198 ||  || — || September 14, 2005 || Catalina || CSS || — || align=right data-sort-value="0.96" | 960 m || 
|-id=199 bgcolor=#fefefe
| 347199 ||  || — || July 29, 2008 || Kitt Peak || Spacewatch || — || align=right data-sort-value="0.86" | 860 m || 
|-id=200 bgcolor=#E9E9E9
| 347200 ||  || — || November 19, 2008 || Catalina || CSS || — || align=right | 2.1 km || 
|}

347201–347300 

|-bgcolor=#fefefe
| 347201 ||  || — || September 6, 2008 || Catalina || CSS || — || align=right data-sort-value="0.99" | 990 m || 
|-id=202 bgcolor=#d6d6d6
| 347202 ||  || — || April 5, 2005 || Palomar || NEAT || EUP || align=right | 3.7 km || 
|-id=203 bgcolor=#E9E9E9
| 347203 ||  || — || February 21, 2006 || Mount Lemmon || Mount Lemmon Survey || — || align=right | 1.4 km || 
|-id=204 bgcolor=#fefefe
| 347204 ||  || — || April 30, 1997 || Socorro || LINEAR || NYS || align=right data-sort-value="0.60" | 600 m || 
|-id=205 bgcolor=#fefefe
| 347205 ||  || — || March 26, 2001 || Socorro || LINEAR || — || align=right data-sort-value="0.89" | 890 m || 
|-id=206 bgcolor=#fefefe
| 347206 ||  || — || May 22, 2001 || Kitt Peak || Spacewatch || FLO || align=right data-sort-value="0.62" | 620 m || 
|-id=207 bgcolor=#fefefe
| 347207 ||  || — || August 30, 2005 || Kitt Peak || Spacewatch || — || align=right data-sort-value="0.83" | 830 m || 
|-id=208 bgcolor=#E9E9E9
| 347208 ||  || — || June 23, 2003 || Anderson Mesa || LONEOS || — || align=right | 1.9 km || 
|-id=209 bgcolor=#E9E9E9
| 347209 ||  || — || October 15, 1995 || Kitt Peak || Spacewatch || WIT || align=right | 1.2 km || 
|-id=210 bgcolor=#d6d6d6
| 347210 ||  || — || March 9, 2005 || Kitt Peak || Spacewatch || EOS || align=right | 2.3 km || 
|-id=211 bgcolor=#fefefe
| 347211 ||  || — || April 3, 2011 || Haleakala || Pan-STARRS || — || align=right data-sort-value="0.90" | 900 m || 
|-id=212 bgcolor=#d6d6d6
| 347212 ||  || — || October 29, 2003 || Kitt Peak || Spacewatch || — || align=right | 3.1 km || 
|-id=213 bgcolor=#E9E9E9
| 347213 ||  || — || April 19, 2006 || Kitt Peak || Spacewatch || — || align=right | 2.7 km || 
|-id=214 bgcolor=#fefefe
| 347214 ||  || — || December 27, 2006 || Mount Lemmon || Mount Lemmon Survey || V || align=right data-sort-value="0.72" | 720 m || 
|-id=215 bgcolor=#fefefe
| 347215 ||  || — || October 6, 2005 || Kitt Peak || Spacewatch || — || align=right data-sort-value="0.68" | 680 m || 
|-id=216 bgcolor=#fefefe
| 347216 ||  || — || November 5, 2005 || Kitt Peak || Spacewatch || — || align=right data-sort-value="0.77" | 770 m || 
|-id=217 bgcolor=#d6d6d6
| 347217 ||  || — || May 21, 2006 || Kitt Peak || Spacewatch || — || align=right | 3.6 km || 
|-id=218 bgcolor=#fefefe
| 347218 ||  || — || February 17, 2004 || Kitt Peak || Spacewatch || — || align=right data-sort-value="0.73" | 730 m || 
|-id=219 bgcolor=#fefefe
| 347219 ||  || — || April 18, 1996 || Kitt Peak || Spacewatch || NYS || align=right data-sort-value="0.59" | 590 m || 
|-id=220 bgcolor=#E9E9E9
| 347220 ||  || — || July 8, 2003 || Palomar || NEAT || — || align=right | 2.3 km || 
|-id=221 bgcolor=#E9E9E9
| 347221 ||  || — || July 12, 2002 || Palomar || NEAT || — || align=right | 2.7 km || 
|-id=222 bgcolor=#fefefe
| 347222 ||  || — || November 10, 2009 || Kitt Peak || Spacewatch || — || align=right data-sort-value="0.80" | 800 m || 
|-id=223 bgcolor=#E9E9E9
| 347223 ||  || — || November 8, 2008 || Mount Lemmon || Mount Lemmon Survey || ADE || align=right | 2.2 km || 
|-id=224 bgcolor=#fefefe
| 347224 ||  || — || March 20, 2004 || Kitt Peak || Spacewatch || — || align=right data-sort-value="0.85" | 850 m || 
|-id=225 bgcolor=#E9E9E9
| 347225 ||  || — || December 31, 2005 || Kitt Peak || Spacewatch || — || align=right | 1.3 km || 
|-id=226 bgcolor=#fefefe
| 347226 ||  || — || September 3, 2008 || La Sagra || OAM Obs. || — || align=right | 1.0 km || 
|-id=227 bgcolor=#fefefe
| 347227 ||  || — || October 1, 2005 || Mount Lemmon || Mount Lemmon Survey || — || align=right data-sort-value="0.92" | 920 m || 
|-id=228 bgcolor=#fefefe
| 347228 ||  || — || April 26, 2011 || Kitt Peak || Spacewatch || V || align=right data-sort-value="0.68" | 680 m || 
|-id=229 bgcolor=#fefefe
| 347229 ||  || — || April 28, 2004 || Kitt Peak || Spacewatch || — || align=right data-sort-value="0.59" | 590 m || 
|-id=230 bgcolor=#d6d6d6
| 347230 ||  || — || September 18, 2001 || Kitt Peak || Spacewatch || URS || align=right | 2.9 km || 
|-id=231 bgcolor=#fefefe
| 347231 ||  || — || December 27, 2006 || Mount Lemmon || Mount Lemmon Survey || V || align=right data-sort-value="0.74" | 740 m || 
|-id=232 bgcolor=#fefefe
| 347232 ||  || — || November 5, 2004 || Palomar || NEAT || H || align=right | 1.0 km || 
|-id=233 bgcolor=#fefefe
| 347233 ||  || — || October 26, 2008 || Mount Lemmon || Mount Lemmon Survey || — || align=right | 1.2 km || 
|-id=234 bgcolor=#d6d6d6
| 347234 ||  || — || July 11, 2005 || Kitt Peak || Spacewatch || EUP || align=right | 5.2 km || 
|-id=235 bgcolor=#E9E9E9
| 347235 ||  || — || January 31, 2006 || Kitt Peak || Spacewatch || — || align=right | 2.0 km || 
|-id=236 bgcolor=#fefefe
| 347236 ||  || — || August 21, 2004 || Siding Spring || SSS || — || align=right | 1.2 km || 
|-id=237 bgcolor=#fefefe
| 347237 ||  || — || November 4, 2005 || Kitt Peak || Spacewatch || — || align=right data-sort-value="0.96" | 960 m || 
|-id=238 bgcolor=#fefefe
| 347238 ||  || — || May 4, 2003 || Haleakala || NEAT || H || align=right | 1.1 km || 
|-id=239 bgcolor=#fefefe
| 347239 ||  || — || March 11, 2007 || Kitt Peak || Spacewatch || NYS || align=right data-sort-value="0.83" | 830 m || 
|-id=240 bgcolor=#E9E9E9
| 347240 ||  || — || January 31, 2006 || Kitt Peak || Spacewatch || — || align=right | 1.3 km || 
|-id=241 bgcolor=#E9E9E9
| 347241 ||  || — || September 29, 2008 || Mount Lemmon || Mount Lemmon Survey || — || align=right | 1.6 km || 
|-id=242 bgcolor=#fefefe
| 347242 ||  || — || January 16, 2004 || Kitt Peak || Spacewatch || — || align=right data-sort-value="0.79" | 790 m || 
|-id=243 bgcolor=#d6d6d6
| 347243 ||  || — || September 9, 2007 || Kitt Peak || Spacewatch || — || align=right | 3.3 km || 
|-id=244 bgcolor=#E9E9E9
| 347244 ||  || — || February 2, 2006 || Kitt Peak || Spacewatch || — || align=right | 2.0 km || 
|-id=245 bgcolor=#fefefe
| 347245 ||  || — || October 31, 2005 || Kitt Peak || Spacewatch || FLO || align=right data-sort-value="0.72" | 720 m || 
|-id=246 bgcolor=#fefefe
| 347246 ||  || — || November 21, 2009 || Kitt Peak || Spacewatch || FLO || align=right data-sort-value="0.80" | 800 m || 
|-id=247 bgcolor=#fefefe
| 347247 ||  || — || March 13, 2007 || Kitt Peak || Spacewatch || NYS || align=right data-sort-value="0.66" | 660 m || 
|-id=248 bgcolor=#d6d6d6
| 347248 ||  || — || May 8, 2006 || Mount Lemmon || Mount Lemmon Survey || — || align=right | 3.2 km || 
|-id=249 bgcolor=#fefefe
| 347249 ||  || — || October 22, 2005 || Kitt Peak || Spacewatch || — || align=right data-sort-value="0.93" | 930 m || 
|-id=250 bgcolor=#fefefe
| 347250 ||  || — || November 1, 2005 || Mount Lemmon || Mount Lemmon Survey || FLO || align=right data-sort-value="0.70" | 700 m || 
|-id=251 bgcolor=#fefefe
| 347251 ||  || — || August 28, 2005 || Kitt Peak || Spacewatch || — || align=right data-sort-value="0.80" | 800 m || 
|-id=252 bgcolor=#E9E9E9
| 347252 ||  || — || November 30, 2003 || Kitt Peak || Spacewatch || — || align=right | 2.6 km || 
|-id=253 bgcolor=#E9E9E9
| 347253 ||  || — || June 3, 2003 || Kitt Peak || Spacewatch || — || align=right data-sort-value="0.94" | 940 m || 
|-id=254 bgcolor=#fefefe
| 347254 ||  || — || November 8, 2009 || Kitt Peak || Spacewatch || — || align=right | 1.0 km || 
|-id=255 bgcolor=#E9E9E9
| 347255 ||  || — || September 21, 2003 || Kitt Peak || Spacewatch || — || align=right | 2.3 km || 
|-id=256 bgcolor=#fefefe
| 347256 ||  || — || September 22, 2008 || Kitt Peak || Spacewatch || — || align=right data-sort-value="0.87" | 870 m || 
|-id=257 bgcolor=#fefefe
| 347257 ||  || — || April 11, 2004 || Palomar || NEAT || — || align=right data-sort-value="0.88" | 880 m || 
|-id=258 bgcolor=#d6d6d6
| 347258 ||  || — || August 21, 2006 || Kitt Peak || Spacewatch || — || align=right | 2.7 km || 
|-id=259 bgcolor=#E9E9E9
| 347259 ||  || — || October 7, 2008 || Mount Lemmon || Mount Lemmon Survey || — || align=right | 1.4 km || 
|-id=260 bgcolor=#E9E9E9
| 347260 ||  || — || September 28, 2003 || Kitt Peak || Spacewatch || — || align=right | 2.0 km || 
|-id=261 bgcolor=#E9E9E9
| 347261 ||  || — || January 8, 2006 || Mount Lemmon || Mount Lemmon Survey || HNS || align=right | 1.2 km || 
|-id=262 bgcolor=#fefefe
| 347262 ||  || — || March 10, 2007 || Kitt Peak || Spacewatch || NYS || align=right data-sort-value="0.71" | 710 m || 
|-id=263 bgcolor=#E9E9E9
| 347263 ||  || — || November 3, 2008 || Mount Lemmon || Mount Lemmon Survey || — || align=right | 1.9 km || 
|-id=264 bgcolor=#E9E9E9
| 347264 ||  || — || August 9, 2007 || Socorro || LINEAR || — || align=right | 1.9 km || 
|-id=265 bgcolor=#E9E9E9
| 347265 ||  || — || October 30, 2008 || Kitt Peak || Spacewatch || — || align=right | 1.2 km || 
|-id=266 bgcolor=#fefefe
| 347266 Carrière ||  ||  || June 13, 2004 || Saint-Sulpice || B. Christophe || — || align=right | 1.0 km || 
|-id=267 bgcolor=#E9E9E9
| 347267 ||  || — || January 27, 2006 || Kitt Peak || Spacewatch || — || align=right | 1.7 km || 
|-id=268 bgcolor=#fefefe
| 347268 ||  || — || October 27, 2005 || Kitt Peak || Spacewatch || FLO || align=right data-sort-value="0.83" | 830 m || 
|-id=269 bgcolor=#E9E9E9
| 347269 ||  || — || December 14, 2004 || Kitt Peak || Spacewatch || — || align=right | 2.6 km || 
|-id=270 bgcolor=#fefefe
| 347270 ||  || — || May 2, 2000 || Kitt Peak || Spacewatch || V || align=right data-sort-value="0.71" | 710 m || 
|-id=271 bgcolor=#E9E9E9
| 347271 ||  || — || February 12, 2002 || Kitt Peak || Spacewatch || — || align=right | 1.5 km || 
|-id=272 bgcolor=#E9E9E9
| 347272 ||  || — || March 6, 2002 || Palomar || NEAT || — || align=right | 1.5 km || 
|-id=273 bgcolor=#E9E9E9
| 347273 ||  || — || November 9, 2008 || Kitt Peak || Spacewatch || — || align=right data-sort-value="0.95" | 950 m || 
|-id=274 bgcolor=#fefefe
| 347274 ||  || — || February 6, 2007 || Mount Lemmon || Mount Lemmon Survey || — || align=right data-sort-value="0.72" | 720 m || 
|-id=275 bgcolor=#fefefe
| 347275 ||  || — || March 17, 2004 || Apache Point || SDSS || — || align=right data-sort-value="0.85" | 850 m || 
|-id=276 bgcolor=#E9E9E9
| 347276 ||  || — || December 3, 2005 || Mauna Kea || A. Boattini || — || align=right | 3.2 km || 
|-id=277 bgcolor=#fefefe
| 347277 ||  || — || November 4, 2005 || Kitt Peak || Spacewatch || — || align=right data-sort-value="0.86" | 860 m || 
|-id=278 bgcolor=#E9E9E9
| 347278 ||  || — || November 7, 2008 || Mount Lemmon || Mount Lemmon Survey || — || align=right | 1.7 km || 
|-id=279 bgcolor=#fefefe
| 347279 ||  || — || November 30, 2005 || Mount Lemmon || Mount Lemmon Survey || V || align=right data-sort-value="0.66" | 660 m || 
|-id=280 bgcolor=#E9E9E9
| 347280 ||  || — || November 7, 2005 || Mauna Kea || A. Boattini || — || align=right | 1.3 km || 
|-id=281 bgcolor=#fefefe
| 347281 ||  || — || October 1, 2005 || Mount Lemmon || Mount Lemmon Survey || FLO || align=right data-sort-value="0.61" | 610 m || 
|-id=282 bgcolor=#fefefe
| 347282 ||  || — || December 5, 2005 || Mount Lemmon || Mount Lemmon Survey || V || align=right data-sort-value="0.78" | 780 m || 
|-id=283 bgcolor=#fefefe
| 347283 ||  || — || September 5, 2008 || Kitt Peak || Spacewatch || — || align=right data-sort-value="0.80" | 800 m || 
|-id=284 bgcolor=#E9E9E9
| 347284 ||  || — || February 24, 2006 || Catalina || CSS || — || align=right | 2.6 km || 
|-id=285 bgcolor=#d6d6d6
| 347285 ||  || — || March 20, 1999 || Apache Point || SDSS || — || align=right | 4.4 km || 
|-id=286 bgcolor=#fefefe
| 347286 ||  || — || February 21, 2007 || Mount Lemmon || Mount Lemmon Survey || NYS || align=right data-sort-value="0.68" | 680 m || 
|-id=287 bgcolor=#fefefe
| 347287 ||  || — || August 10, 2001 || Palomar || NEAT || — || align=right data-sort-value="0.89" | 890 m || 
|-id=288 bgcolor=#E9E9E9
| 347288 ||  || — || December 13, 2007 || Socorro || LINEAR || WAT || align=right | 2.1 km || 
|-id=289 bgcolor=#d6d6d6
| 347289 ||  || — || May 4, 2000 || Apache Point || SDSS || — || align=right | 3.4 km || 
|-id=290 bgcolor=#E9E9E9
| 347290 ||  || — || July 21, 2002 || Palomar || NEAT || GEF || align=right | 1.8 km || 
|-id=291 bgcolor=#d6d6d6
| 347291 ||  || — || July 3, 2000 || Kitt Peak || Spacewatch || — || align=right | 3.8 km || 
|-id=292 bgcolor=#E9E9E9
| 347292 ||  || — || October 1, 2003 || Kitt Peak || Spacewatch || WIT || align=right | 1.0 km || 
|-id=293 bgcolor=#E9E9E9
| 347293 ||  || — || October 25, 2008 || Kitt Peak || Spacewatch || — || align=right | 1.3 km || 
|-id=294 bgcolor=#d6d6d6
| 347294 ||  || — || August 1, 2000 || Cerro Tololo || M. W. Buie || TIR || align=right | 3.8 km || 
|-id=295 bgcolor=#d6d6d6
| 347295 ||  || — || February 8, 2010 || WISE || WISE || URS || align=right | 5.4 km || 
|-id=296 bgcolor=#C2FFFF
| 347296 ||  || — || January 16, 2005 || Kitt Peak || Spacewatch || L5 || align=right | 11 km || 
|-id=297 bgcolor=#d6d6d6
| 347297 ||  || — || September 16, 2006 || Catalina || CSS || — || align=right | 3.9 km || 
|-id=298 bgcolor=#fefefe
| 347298 ||  || — || December 15, 2004 || Socorro || LINEAR || — || align=right | 1.6 km || 
|-id=299 bgcolor=#C2FFFF
| 347299 ||  || — || June 1, 2011 || ESA OGS || ESA OGS || L5 || align=right | 11 km || 
|-id=300 bgcolor=#E9E9E9
| 347300 ||  || — || December 14, 2004 || Socorro || LINEAR || — || align=right | 1.2 km || 
|}

347301–347400 

|-bgcolor=#E9E9E9
| 347301 ||  || — || December 17, 2003 || Kitt Peak || Spacewatch || PAD || align=right | 2.6 km || 
|-id=302 bgcolor=#d6d6d6
| 347302 ||  || — || February 21, 2009 || Mount Lemmon || Mount Lemmon Survey || THM || align=right | 2.9 km || 
|-id=303 bgcolor=#d6d6d6
| 347303 ||  || — || July 3, 1995 || Kitt Peak || Spacewatch || — || align=right | 4.2 km || 
|-id=304 bgcolor=#d6d6d6
| 347304 ||  || — || December 20, 2007 || Mount Lemmon || Mount Lemmon Survey || — || align=right | 4.4 km || 
|-id=305 bgcolor=#E9E9E9
| 347305 ||  || — || October 4, 2003 || Kitt Peak || Spacewatch || — || align=right | 2.4 km || 
|-id=306 bgcolor=#E9E9E9
| 347306 ||  || — || September 19, 1995 || Kitt Peak || Spacewatch || — || align=right | 1.3 km || 
|-id=307 bgcolor=#d6d6d6
| 347307 ||  || — || October 20, 2006 || Kitt Peak || Spacewatch || — || align=right | 3.4 km || 
|-id=308 bgcolor=#d6d6d6
| 347308 ||  || — || November 17, 2007 || Kitt Peak || Spacewatch || — || align=right | 4.2 km || 
|-id=309 bgcolor=#d6d6d6
| 347309 ||  || — || September 20, 2006 || Catalina || CSS || — || align=right | 3.9 km || 
|-id=310 bgcolor=#d6d6d6
| 347310 ||  || — || July 5, 2005 || Palomar || NEAT || HYG || align=right | 3.1 km || 
|-id=311 bgcolor=#d6d6d6
| 347311 ||  || — || February 4, 2009 || Mount Lemmon || Mount Lemmon Survey || — || align=right | 3.2 km || 
|-id=312 bgcolor=#d6d6d6
| 347312 ||  || — || November 21, 2001 || Apache Point || SDSS || — || align=right | 3.3 km || 
|-id=313 bgcolor=#C2FFFF
| 347313 ||  || — || February 1, 2006 || Mount Lemmon || Mount Lemmon Survey || L5 || align=right | 8.5 km || 
|-id=314 bgcolor=#C2FFFF
| 347314 ||  || — || April 5, 2008 || Kitt Peak || Spacewatch || L5 || align=right | 7.7 km || 
|-id=315 bgcolor=#C2FFFF
| 347315 ||  || — || November 11, 2001 || Apache Point || SDSS || L5 || align=right | 9.5 km || 
|-id=316 bgcolor=#d6d6d6
| 347316 ||  || — || October 17, 2001 || Socorro || LINEAR || — || align=right | 3.0 km || 
|-id=317 bgcolor=#d6d6d6
| 347317 ||  || — || September 30, 2006 || Mount Lemmon || Mount Lemmon Survey || KOR || align=right | 1.8 km || 
|-id=318 bgcolor=#C2FFFF
| 347318 ||  || — || March 4, 2005 || Mount Lemmon || Mount Lemmon Survey || L5 || align=right | 8.4 km || 
|-id=319 bgcolor=#fefefe
| 347319 ||  || — || December 10, 2004 || Socorro || LINEAR || — || align=right | 1.8 km || 
|-id=320 bgcolor=#d6d6d6
| 347320 ||  || — || November 7, 2007 || Kitt Peak || Spacewatch || — || align=right | 3.3 km || 
|-id=321 bgcolor=#d6d6d6
| 347321 ||  || — || October 12, 2006 || Palomar || NEAT || EOS || align=right | 2.1 km || 
|-id=322 bgcolor=#d6d6d6
| 347322 ||  || — || March 15, 2004 || Kitt Peak || Spacewatch || — || align=right | 6.7 km || 
|-id=323 bgcolor=#d6d6d6
| 347323 ||  || — || March 12, 2010 || WISE || WISE || SYL7:4 || align=right | 4.3 km || 
|-id=324 bgcolor=#d6d6d6
| 347324 ||  || — || January 28, 2003 || Apache Point || SDSS || — || align=right | 3.4 km || 
|-id=325 bgcolor=#d6d6d6
| 347325 ||  || — || March 12, 2003 || Kitt Peak || Spacewatch || — || align=right | 2.8 km || 
|-id=326 bgcolor=#d6d6d6
| 347326 ||  || — || March 17, 2009 || Kitt Peak || Spacewatch || — || align=right | 5.5 km || 
|-id=327 bgcolor=#d6d6d6
| 347327 ||  || — || November 14, 2006 || Mount Lemmon || Mount Lemmon Survey || HYG || align=right | 3.1 km || 
|-id=328 bgcolor=#d6d6d6
| 347328 ||  || — || May 14, 2004 || Kitt Peak || Spacewatch || EOS || align=right | 2.0 km || 
|-id=329 bgcolor=#d6d6d6
| 347329 ||  || — || September 30, 2006 || Mount Lemmon || Mount Lemmon Survey || — || align=right | 3.4 km || 
|-id=330 bgcolor=#C2FFFF
| 347330 ||  || — || March 18, 2007 || Kitt Peak || Spacewatch || L5 || align=right | 9.1 km || 
|-id=331 bgcolor=#d6d6d6
| 347331 ||  || — || September 11, 2005 || Kitt Peak || Spacewatch || — || align=right | 3.8 km || 
|-id=332 bgcolor=#d6d6d6
| 347332 ||  || — || October 28, 2006 || Kitt Peak || Spacewatch || — || align=right | 4.3 km || 
|-id=333 bgcolor=#d6d6d6
| 347333 ||  || — || November 13, 2005 || Palomar || NEAT || EUP || align=right | 4.1 km || 
|-id=334 bgcolor=#d6d6d6
| 347334 ||  || — || November 23, 2009 || Mount Lemmon || Mount Lemmon Survey || — || align=right | 4.6 km || 
|-id=335 bgcolor=#d6d6d6
| 347335 ||  || — || August 24, 2001 || Socorro || LINEAR || — || align=right | 2.8 km || 
|-id=336 bgcolor=#d6d6d6
| 347336 Changmeemann ||  ||  || August 18, 2007 || XuYi || PMO NEO || EOS || align=right | 2.8 km || 
|-id=337 bgcolor=#fefefe
| 347337 ||  || — || March 9, 2006 || Kitt Peak || Spacewatch || H || align=right data-sort-value="0.91" | 910 m || 
|-id=338 bgcolor=#E9E9E9
| 347338 ||  || — || March 20, 2007 || Mount Lemmon || Mount Lemmon Survey || — || align=right | 2.8 km || 
|-id=339 bgcolor=#E9E9E9
| 347339 ||  || — || March 2, 2006 || Kitt Peak || Spacewatch || — || align=right | 1.9 km || 
|-id=340 bgcolor=#fefefe
| 347340 ||  || — || September 20, 2001 || Apache Point || SDSS || V || align=right data-sort-value="0.84" | 840 m || 
|-id=341 bgcolor=#fefefe
| 347341 ||  || — || February 7, 2002 || Socorro || LINEAR || — || align=right | 1.3 km || 
|-id=342 bgcolor=#fefefe
| 347342 ||  || — || January 17, 2010 || Kitt Peak || Spacewatch || — || align=right | 1.0 km || 
|-id=343 bgcolor=#fefefe
| 347343 ||  || — || December 1, 2005 || Kitt Peak || Spacewatch || — || align=right | 1.3 km || 
|-id=344 bgcolor=#d6d6d6
| 347344 ||  || — || March 19, 2001 || Kitt Peak || Spacewatch || — || align=right | 2.7 km || 
|-id=345 bgcolor=#fefefe
| 347345 ||  || — || December 2, 2005 || Mount Lemmon || Mount Lemmon Survey || MAS || align=right data-sort-value="0.78" | 780 m || 
|-id=346 bgcolor=#d6d6d6
| 347346 ||  || — || September 22, 1995 || Kitt Peak || Spacewatch || — || align=right | 3.6 km || 
|-id=347 bgcolor=#fefefe
| 347347 ||  || — || May 29, 2008 || Mount Lemmon || Mount Lemmon Survey || V || align=right data-sort-value="0.75" | 750 m || 
|-id=348 bgcolor=#d6d6d6
| 347348 ||  || — || September 5, 2007 || Catalina || CSS || BRA || align=right | 1.9 km || 
|-id=349 bgcolor=#fefefe
| 347349 ||  || — || January 15, 2004 || Kitt Peak || Spacewatch || — || align=right data-sort-value="0.78" | 780 m || 
|-id=350 bgcolor=#fefefe
| 347350 ||  || — || May 31, 2008 || Mount Lemmon || Mount Lemmon Survey || — || align=right | 1.3 km || 
|-id=351 bgcolor=#E9E9E9
| 347351 ||  || — || September 28, 2003 || Kitt Peak || Spacewatch || — || align=right | 2.8 km || 
|-id=352 bgcolor=#d6d6d6
| 347352 ||  || — || September 21, 2001 || Kitt Peak || Spacewatch || — || align=right | 3.7 km || 
|-id=353 bgcolor=#fefefe
| 347353 ||  || — || November 4, 2005 || Mount Lemmon || Mount Lemmon Survey || V || align=right data-sort-value="0.88" | 880 m || 
|-id=354 bgcolor=#fefefe
| 347354 ||  || — || January 9, 2006 || Kitt Peak || Spacewatch || MAS || align=right data-sort-value="0.75" | 750 m || 
|-id=355 bgcolor=#fefefe
| 347355 ||  || — || April 16, 2007 || Mount Lemmon || Mount Lemmon Survey || — || align=right | 1.1 km || 
|-id=356 bgcolor=#E9E9E9
| 347356 ||  || — || February 7, 2000 || Kitt Peak || Spacewatch || — || align=right | 1.8 km || 
|-id=357 bgcolor=#fefefe
| 347357 ||  || — || December 21, 2005 || Kitt Peak || Spacewatch || MAS || align=right data-sort-value="0.90" | 900 m || 
|-id=358 bgcolor=#d6d6d6
| 347358 ||  || — || February 1, 2003 || Palomar || NEAT || — || align=right | 5.3 km || 
|-id=359 bgcolor=#fefefe
| 347359 ||  || — || December 1, 2005 || Mount Lemmon || Mount Lemmon Survey || MAS || align=right data-sort-value="0.94" | 940 m || 
|-id=360 bgcolor=#E9E9E9
| 347360 ||  || — || October 24, 2008 || Catalina || CSS || — || align=right | 3.0 km || 
|-id=361 bgcolor=#fefefe
| 347361 ||  || — || October 16, 1977 || Palomar || PLS || — || align=right data-sort-value="0.76" | 760 m || 
|-id=362 bgcolor=#d6d6d6
| 347362 ||  || — || July 9, 2002 || Palomar || NEAT || — || align=right | 5.3 km || 
|-id=363 bgcolor=#E9E9E9
| 347363 ||  || — || October 15, 1995 || Kitt Peak || Spacewatch || JUN || align=right | 1.2 km || 
|-id=364 bgcolor=#fefefe
| 347364 ||  || — || September 4, 2002 || Anderson Mesa || LONEOS || — || align=right data-sort-value="0.87" | 870 m || 
|-id=365 bgcolor=#fefefe
| 347365 ||  || — || March 15, 2004 || Socorro || LINEAR || — || align=right | 1.1 km || 
|-id=366 bgcolor=#fefefe
| 347366 ||  || — || July 26, 2001 || Kitt Peak || Spacewatch || — || align=right data-sort-value="0.75" | 750 m || 
|-id=367 bgcolor=#fefefe
| 347367 ||  || — || September 30, 2005 || Kitt Peak || Spacewatch || NYS || align=right data-sort-value="0.52" | 520 m || 
|-id=368 bgcolor=#d6d6d6
| 347368 ||  || — || August 16, 2006 || Siding Spring || SSS || LIX || align=right | 4.2 km || 
|-id=369 bgcolor=#fefefe
| 347369 ||  || — || October 22, 2005 || Kitt Peak || Spacewatch || NYS || align=right data-sort-value="0.76" | 760 m || 
|-id=370 bgcolor=#fefefe
| 347370 ||  || — || September 6, 2008 || Catalina || CSS || NYS || align=right data-sort-value="0.80" | 800 m || 
|-id=371 bgcolor=#fefefe
| 347371 ||  || — || August 23, 2001 || Anderson Mesa || LONEOS || NYS || align=right data-sort-value="0.71" | 710 m || 
|-id=372 bgcolor=#d6d6d6
| 347372 ||  || — || October 14, 2001 || Socorro || LINEAR || — || align=right | 3.9 km || 
|-id=373 bgcolor=#E9E9E9
| 347373 ||  || — || July 29, 2008 || Mount Lemmon || Mount Lemmon Survey || EUN || align=right | 2.1 km || 
|-id=374 bgcolor=#d6d6d6
| 347374 ||  || — || February 14, 2000 || Kitt Peak || Spacewatch || — || align=right | 2.6 km || 
|-id=375 bgcolor=#FA8072
| 347375 ||  || — || October 3, 1996 || Prescott || P. G. Comba || — || align=right data-sort-value="0.86" | 860 m || 
|-id=376 bgcolor=#fefefe
| 347376 ||  || — || January 9, 2006 || Kitt Peak || Spacewatch || — || align=right | 1.3 km || 
|-id=377 bgcolor=#fefefe
| 347377 ||  || — || October 4, 2002 || Socorro || LINEAR || — || align=right data-sort-value="0.95" | 950 m || 
|-id=378 bgcolor=#d6d6d6
| 347378 ||  || — || September 15, 2012 || Kitt Peak || Spacewatch || — || align=right | 3.7 km || 
|-id=379 bgcolor=#fefefe
| 347379 ||  || — || April 29, 2008 || Mount Lemmon || Mount Lemmon Survey || — || align=right data-sort-value="0.92" | 920 m || 
|-id=380 bgcolor=#E9E9E9
| 347380 ||  || — || September 26, 2003 || Desert Eagle || W. K. Y. Yeung || — || align=right | 2.5 km || 
|-id=381 bgcolor=#fefefe
| 347381 ||  || — || February 23, 2007 || Mount Lemmon || Mount Lemmon Survey || NYS || align=right data-sort-value="0.97" | 970 m || 
|-id=382 bgcolor=#fefefe
| 347382 ||  || — || November 19, 2009 || Kitt Peak || Spacewatch || FLO || align=right data-sort-value="0.62" | 620 m || 
|-id=383 bgcolor=#E9E9E9
| 347383 ||  || — || January 8, 2005 || Campo Imperatore || CINEOS || MRX || align=right | 1.2 km || 
|-id=384 bgcolor=#E9E9E9
| 347384 ||  || — || November 29, 2003 || Kitt Peak || Spacewatch || — || align=right | 2.6 km || 
|-id=385 bgcolor=#d6d6d6
| 347385 ||  || — || September 14, 2006 || Catalina || CSS || — || align=right | 4.6 km || 
|-id=386 bgcolor=#d6d6d6
| 347386 ||  || — || December 29, 2003 || Kitt Peak || Spacewatch || CHA || align=right | 1.8 km || 
|-id=387 bgcolor=#fefefe
| 347387 ||  || — || October 23, 2001 || Socorro || LINEAR || EUT || align=right data-sort-value="0.88" | 880 m || 
|-id=388 bgcolor=#fefefe
| 347388 ||  || — || October 4, 2002 || Campo Imperatore || CINEOS || NYS || align=right | 1.9 km || 
|-id=389 bgcolor=#E9E9E9
| 347389 ||  || — || September 27, 2003 || Kitt Peak || Spacewatch || — || align=right | 2.4 km || 
|-id=390 bgcolor=#E9E9E9
| 347390 ||  || — || October 24, 2003 || Kitt Peak || Spacewatch || HOF || align=right | 2.8 km || 
|-id=391 bgcolor=#fefefe
| 347391 ||  || — || November 29, 2005 || Mount Lemmon || Mount Lemmon Survey || — || align=right data-sort-value="0.91" | 910 m || 
|-id=392 bgcolor=#d6d6d6
| 347392 ||  || — || August 19, 2006 || Kitt Peak || Spacewatch || — || align=right | 2.8 km || 
|-id=393 bgcolor=#d6d6d6
| 347393 ||  || — || February 26, 2004 || Kitt Peak || M. W. Buie || — || align=right | 2.5 km || 
|-id=394 bgcolor=#fefefe
| 347394 ||  || — || January 7, 2006 || Mount Lemmon || Mount Lemmon Survey || MASfast? || align=right data-sort-value="0.87" | 870 m || 
|-id=395 bgcolor=#fefefe
| 347395 ||  || — || February 23, 2007 || Mount Lemmon || Mount Lemmon Survey || — || align=right | 1.0 km || 
|-id=396 bgcolor=#fefefe
| 347396 ||  || — || August 31, 2005 || Kitt Peak || Spacewatch || V || align=right | 1.9 km || 
|-id=397 bgcolor=#d6d6d6
| 347397 ||  || — || October 11, 2001 || Palomar || NEAT || THM || align=right | 2.6 km || 
|-id=398 bgcolor=#E9E9E9
| 347398 ||  || — || October 1, 2008 || Kitt Peak || Spacewatch || — || align=right | 1.7 km || 
|-id=399 bgcolor=#E9E9E9
| 347399 ||  || — || January 15, 2005 || Kitt Peak || Spacewatch || WIT || align=right | 1.2 km || 
|-id=400 bgcolor=#fefefe
| 347400 ||  || — || August 14, 2001 || Haleakala || NEAT || — || align=right data-sort-value="0.80" | 800 m || 
|}

347401–347500 

|-bgcolor=#d6d6d6
| 347401 ||  || — || October 16, 2007 || Mount Lemmon || Mount Lemmon Survey || — || align=right | 3.8 km || 
|-id=402 bgcolor=#d6d6d6
| 347402 ||  || — || August 25, 1995 || Kitt Peak || Spacewatch || — || align=right | 3.8 km || 
|-id=403 bgcolor=#E9E9E9
| 347403 ||  || — || September 19, 2003 || Kitt Peak || Spacewatch || HEN || align=right data-sort-value="0.97" | 970 m || 
|-id=404 bgcolor=#E9E9E9
| 347404 ||  || — || November 16, 2003 || Kitt Peak || Spacewatch || — || align=right | 2.9 km || 
|-id=405 bgcolor=#E9E9E9
| 347405 ||  || — || November 9, 1999 || Socorro || LINEAR || — || align=right | 1.8 km || 
|-id=406 bgcolor=#fefefe
| 347406 ||  || — || September 24, 2008 || Mount Lemmon || Mount Lemmon Survey || — || align=right data-sort-value="0.81" | 810 m || 
|-id=407 bgcolor=#C2FFFF
| 347407 ||  || — || January 31, 2006 || Kitt Peak || Spacewatch || L5 || align=right | 9.3 km || 
|-id=408 bgcolor=#fefefe
| 347408 ||  || — || June 1, 2008 || Mount Lemmon || Mount Lemmon Survey || MAS || align=right data-sort-value="0.86" | 860 m || 
|-id=409 bgcolor=#d6d6d6
| 347409 ||  || — || September 19, 2001 || Socorro || LINEAR || — || align=right | 2.9 km || 
|-id=410 bgcolor=#E9E9E9
| 347410 ||  || — || November 2, 2008 || Mount Lemmon || Mount Lemmon Survey || — || align=right data-sort-value="0.97" | 970 m || 
|-id=411 bgcolor=#fefefe
| 347411 ||  || — || January 30, 2004 || Kitt Peak || Spacewatch || — || align=right data-sort-value="0.69" | 690 m || 
|-id=412 bgcolor=#d6d6d6
| 347412 ||  || — || April 11, 2005 || Mount Lemmon || Mount Lemmon Survey || EOS || align=right | 1.7 km || 
|-id=413 bgcolor=#d6d6d6
| 347413 ||  || — || September 11, 2004 || Kitt Peak || Spacewatch || SHU3:2 || align=right | 7.5 km || 
|-id=414 bgcolor=#d6d6d6
| 347414 ||  || — || August 27, 2006 || Anderson Mesa || LONEOS || — || align=right | 4.6 km || 
|-id=415 bgcolor=#d6d6d6
| 347415 ||  || — || September 13, 2007 || Mount Lemmon || Mount Lemmon Survey || CHA || align=right | 2.8 km || 
|-id=416 bgcolor=#d6d6d6
| 347416 ||  || — || October 24, 2001 || Kitt Peak || Spacewatch || — || align=right | 3.3 km || 
|-id=417 bgcolor=#E9E9E9
| 347417 ||  || — || November 19, 2003 || Catalina || CSS || — || align=right | 3.2 km || 
|-id=418 bgcolor=#d6d6d6
| 347418 ||  || — || October 14, 2001 || Kitt Peak || Spacewatch || — || align=right | 3.4 km || 
|-id=419 bgcolor=#d6d6d6
| 347419 ||  || — || September 13, 2007 || Mount Lemmon || Mount Lemmon Survey || — || align=right | 3.3 km || 
|-id=420 bgcolor=#d6d6d6
| 347420 ||  || — || December 12, 1998 || Kitt Peak || Spacewatch || KOR || align=right | 1.8 km || 
|-id=421 bgcolor=#fefefe
| 347421 ||  || — || July 27, 2005 || Palomar || NEAT || FLO || align=right data-sort-value="0.73" | 730 m || 
|-id=422 bgcolor=#d6d6d6
| 347422 ||  || — || August 17, 2006 || Palomar || NEAT || — || align=right | 3.8 km || 
|-id=423 bgcolor=#d6d6d6
| 347423 ||  || — || April 2, 2005 || Kitt Peak || Spacewatch || — || align=right | 3.5 km || 
|-id=424 bgcolor=#E9E9E9
| 347424 ||  || — || February 9, 2005 || Mount Lemmon || Mount Lemmon Survey || HOF || align=right | 3.4 km || 
|-id=425 bgcolor=#E9E9E9
| 347425 ||  || — || September 19, 1998 || Apache Point || SDSS || — || align=right | 3.5 km || 
|-id=426 bgcolor=#fefefe
| 347426 ||  || — || May 14, 2005 || Palomar || NEAT || — || align=right data-sort-value="0.91" | 910 m || 
|-id=427 bgcolor=#fefefe
| 347427 ||  || — || April 5, 2000 || Socorro || LINEAR || ERI || align=right | 2.1 km || 
|-id=428 bgcolor=#fefefe
| 347428 ||  || — || September 7, 2008 || Catalina || CSS || V || align=right data-sort-value="0.89" | 890 m || 
|-id=429 bgcolor=#fefefe
| 347429 ||  || — || September 18, 2001 || Anderson Mesa || LONEOS || V || align=right data-sort-value="0.74" | 740 m || 
|-id=430 bgcolor=#E9E9E9
| 347430 ||  || — || September 23, 2008 || Mount Lemmon || Mount Lemmon Survey || — || align=right | 1.0 km || 
|-id=431 bgcolor=#d6d6d6
| 347431 ||  || — || February 13, 2004 || Kitt Peak || Spacewatch || — || align=right | 3.2 km || 
|-id=432 bgcolor=#d6d6d6
| 347432 ||  || — || October 14, 2001 || Kitt Peak || Spacewatch || — || align=right | 5.0 km || 
|-id=433 bgcolor=#E9E9E9
| 347433 ||  || — || September 18, 2003 || Palomar || NEAT || — || align=right | 1.7 km || 
|-id=434 bgcolor=#E9E9E9
| 347434 ||  || — || April 18, 2006 || Kitt Peak || Spacewatch || HOF || align=right | 2.8 km || 
|-id=435 bgcolor=#d6d6d6
| 347435 ||  || — || October 18, 2001 || Palomar || NEAT || — || align=right | 3.5 km || 
|-id=436 bgcolor=#d6d6d6
| 347436 ||  || — || October 21, 2007 || Mount Lemmon || Mount Lemmon Survey || EOS || align=right | 2.7 km || 
|-id=437 bgcolor=#d6d6d6
| 347437 ||  || — || August 29, 2006 || Kitt Peak || Spacewatch || — || align=right | 2.6 km || 
|-id=438 bgcolor=#E9E9E9
| 347438 ||  || — || February 7, 2006 || Kitt Peak || Spacewatch || — || align=right | 1.4 km || 
|-id=439 bgcolor=#E9E9E9
| 347439 ||  || — || March 23, 2006 || Catalina || CSS || EUN || align=right | 1.4 km || 
|-id=440 bgcolor=#fefefe
| 347440 ||  || — || October 28, 2005 || Catalina || CSS || — || align=right data-sort-value="0.97" | 970 m || 
|-id=441 bgcolor=#E9E9E9
| 347441 ||  || — || September 19, 2003 || Kitt Peak || Spacewatch || NEM || align=right | 2.5 km || 
|-id=442 bgcolor=#E9E9E9
| 347442 ||  || — || February 1, 2005 || Kitt Peak || Spacewatch || AST || align=right | 1.8 km || 
|-id=443 bgcolor=#d6d6d6
| 347443 ||  || — || September 20, 2001 || Kitt Peak || Spacewatch || HYG || align=right | 2.7 km || 
|-id=444 bgcolor=#E9E9E9
| 347444 ||  || — || October 31, 1999 || Kitt Peak || Spacewatch || — || align=right | 1.3 km || 
|-id=445 bgcolor=#E9E9E9
| 347445 ||  || — || September 30, 2003 || Kitt Peak || Spacewatch || — || align=right | 2.2 km || 
|-id=446 bgcolor=#C2FFFF
| 347446 ||  || — || December 18, 2004 || Mount Lemmon || Mount Lemmon Survey || L5 || align=right | 17 km || 
|-id=447 bgcolor=#fefefe
| 347447 ||  || — || November 10, 2005 || Mount Lemmon || Mount Lemmon Survey || V || align=right data-sort-value="0.86" | 860 m || 
|-id=448 bgcolor=#fefefe
| 347448 ||  || — || December 5, 2005 || Kitt Peak || Spacewatch || NYS || align=right data-sort-value="0.79" | 790 m || 
|-id=449 bgcolor=#C7FF8F
| 347449 ||  || — || April 23, 1998 || Socorro || LINEAR || unusual || align=right | 14 km || 
|-id=450 bgcolor=#E9E9E9
| 347450 ||  || — || October 18, 2003 || Kitt Peak || Spacewatch || XIZ || align=right | 2.8 km || 
|-id=451 bgcolor=#d6d6d6
| 347451 ||  || — || September 19, 2007 || Kitt Peak || Spacewatch || KAR || align=right | 1.3 km || 
|-id=452 bgcolor=#C2FFFF
| 347452 ||  || — || April 9, 2008 || Kitt Peak || Spacewatch || L5 || align=right | 5.4 km || 
|-id=453 bgcolor=#d6d6d6
| 347453 ||  || — || August 21, 2006 || Kitt Peak || Spacewatch || — || align=right | 3.3 km || 
|-id=454 bgcolor=#d6d6d6
| 347454 ||  || — || October 8, 2007 || Mount Lemmon || Mount Lemmon Survey || — || align=right | 2.8 km || 
|-id=455 bgcolor=#C2FFFF
| 347455 ||  || — || February 23, 2007 || Kitt Peak || Spacewatch || L5 || align=right | 12 km || 
|-id=456 bgcolor=#d6d6d6
| 347456 ||  || — || September 10, 2007 || Kitt Peak || Spacewatch || KOR || align=right | 1.7 km || 
|-id=457 bgcolor=#d6d6d6
| 347457 ||  || — || September 11, 2001 || Kitt Peak || Spacewatch || THM || align=right | 2.1 km || 
|-id=458 bgcolor=#d6d6d6
| 347458 ||  || — || April 11, 2004 || Palomar || NEAT || — || align=right | 5.5 km || 
|-id=459 bgcolor=#fefefe
| 347459 ||  || — || September 19, 2001 || Socorro || LINEAR || MAS || align=right data-sort-value="0.69" | 690 m || 
|-id=460 bgcolor=#fefefe
| 347460 ||  || — || April 15, 2008 || Kitt Peak || Spacewatch || — || align=right data-sort-value="0.79" | 790 m || 
|-id=461 bgcolor=#E9E9E9
| 347461 ||  || — || April 2, 2006 || Kitt Peak || Spacewatch || — || align=right | 1.7 km || 
|-id=462 bgcolor=#E9E9E9
| 347462 ||  || — || October 6, 2004 || Kitt Peak || Spacewatch || — || align=right data-sort-value="0.91" | 910 m || 
|-id=463 bgcolor=#fefefe
| 347463 ||  || — || August 19, 2008 || Siding Spring || SSS || — || align=right data-sort-value="0.98" | 980 m || 
|-id=464 bgcolor=#E9E9E9
| 347464 ||  || — || November 27, 1999 || Anderson Mesa || LONEOS || IAN || align=right | 1.7 km || 
|-id=465 bgcolor=#E9E9E9
| 347465 ||  || — || March 18, 1998 || Kitt Peak || Spacewatch || — || align=right | 2.0 km || 
|-id=466 bgcolor=#fefefe
| 347466 ||  || — || September 28, 2005 || Palomar || NEAT || NYS || align=right data-sort-value="0.69" | 690 m || 
|-id=467 bgcolor=#E9E9E9
| 347467 ||  || — || February 27, 2006 || Kitt Peak || Spacewatch || — || align=right | 1.7 km || 
|-id=468 bgcolor=#E9E9E9
| 347468 ||  || — || December 14, 2004 || Kitt Peak || Spacewatch || — || align=right | 1.6 km || 
|-id=469 bgcolor=#d6d6d6
| 347469 ||  || — || February 23, 2003 || Anderson Mesa || LONEOS || — || align=right | 5.0 km || 
|-id=470 bgcolor=#fefefe
| 347470 ||  || — || December 18, 2001 || Palomar || NEAT || — || align=right | 1.3 km || 
|-id=471 bgcolor=#E9E9E9
| 347471 ||  || — || November 2, 2008 || Mount Lemmon || Mount Lemmon Survey || — || align=right | 1.8 km || 
|-id=472 bgcolor=#fefefe
| 347472 ||  || — || December 1, 1994 || Kitt Peak || Spacewatch || — || align=right data-sort-value="0.87" | 870 m || 
|-id=473 bgcolor=#d6d6d6
| 347473 ||  || — || October 9, 2007 || Mount Lemmon || Mount Lemmon Survey || — || align=right | 3.1 km || 
|-id=474 bgcolor=#E9E9E9
| 347474 ||  || — || April 26, 2006 || Kitt Peak || Spacewatch || — || align=right | 2.2 km || 
|-id=475 bgcolor=#d6d6d6
| 347475 ||  || — || September 16, 2006 || Kitt Peak || Spacewatch || HYG || align=right | 3.4 km || 
|-id=476 bgcolor=#E9E9E9
| 347476 ||  || — || August 7, 1999 || Anderson Mesa || LONEOS || — || align=right | 2.8 km || 
|-id=477 bgcolor=#fefefe
| 347477 ||  || — || September 30, 1995 || Kitt Peak || Spacewatch || NYS || align=right data-sort-value="0.66" | 660 m || 
|-id=478 bgcolor=#fefefe
| 347478 ||  || — || November 25, 2005 || Catalina || CSS || — || align=right | 1.2 km || 
|-id=479 bgcolor=#E9E9E9
| 347479 ||  || — || July 23, 2003 || Palomar || NEAT || ADE || align=right | 2.7 km || 
|-id=480 bgcolor=#fefefe
| 347480 ||  || — || September 30, 1973 || Palomar || PLS || — || align=right data-sort-value="0.93" | 930 m || 
|-id=481 bgcolor=#d6d6d6
| 347481 ||  || — || October 17, 1977 || Palomar || PLS || — || align=right | 3.5 km || 
|-id=482 bgcolor=#d6d6d6
| 347482 ||  || — || March 17, 1993 || La Silla || UESAC || — || align=right | 3.6 km || 
|-id=483 bgcolor=#fefefe
| 347483 ||  || — || October 15, 1993 || Kitt Peak || Spacewatch || NYS || align=right data-sort-value="0.69" | 690 m || 
|-id=484 bgcolor=#d6d6d6
| 347484 ||  || — || September 28, 1994 || Kitt Peak || Spacewatch || — || align=right | 3.5 km || 
|-id=485 bgcolor=#E9E9E9
| 347485 ||  || — || October 28, 1994 || Kitt Peak || Spacewatch || — || align=right | 1.5 km || 
|-id=486 bgcolor=#fefefe
| 347486 ||  || — || April 26, 1995 || Kitt Peak || Spacewatch || NYS || align=right data-sort-value="0.81" | 810 m || 
|-id=487 bgcolor=#E9E9E9
| 347487 ||  || — || June 29, 1995 || Kitt Peak || Spacewatch || — || align=right | 1.3 km || 
|-id=488 bgcolor=#E9E9E9
| 347488 ||  || — || July 25, 1995 || Kitt Peak || Spacewatch || — || align=right data-sort-value="0.93" | 930 m || 
|-id=489 bgcolor=#E9E9E9
| 347489 ||  || — || October 15, 1995 || Kitt Peak || Spacewatch || — || align=right | 1.2 km || 
|-id=490 bgcolor=#E9E9E9
| 347490 ||  || — || October 1, 1995 || Kitt Peak || Spacewatch || — || align=right | 1.2 km || 
|-id=491 bgcolor=#E9E9E9
| 347491 ||  || — || November 16, 1995 || Kitt Peak || Spacewatch || — || align=right | 1.1 km || 
|-id=492 bgcolor=#fefefe
| 347492 ||  || — || January 15, 1996 || Kitt Peak || Spacewatch || FLO || align=right data-sort-value="0.60" | 600 m || 
|-id=493 bgcolor=#fefefe
| 347493 ||  || — || November 3, 1996 || Kitt Peak || Spacewatch || — || align=right | 1.3 km || 
|-id=494 bgcolor=#d6d6d6
| 347494 ||  || — || November 11, 1996 || Kitt Peak || Spacewatch || — || align=right | 2.4 km || 
|-id=495 bgcolor=#E9E9E9
| 347495 ||  || — || August 20, 1998 || Kitt Peak || Spacewatch || — || align=right | 1.7 km || 
|-id=496 bgcolor=#E9E9E9
| 347496 ||  || — || August 30, 1998 || Kitt Peak || Spacewatch || AER || align=right | 1.5 km || 
|-id=497 bgcolor=#E9E9E9
| 347497 ||  || — || August 21, 1998 || Haleakala || NEAT || — || align=right | 3.0 km || 
|-id=498 bgcolor=#E9E9E9
| 347498 ||  || — || September 14, 1998 || Socorro || LINEAR || — || align=right | 2.8 km || 
|-id=499 bgcolor=#FA8072
| 347499 ||  || — || September 19, 1998 || Catalina || CSS || — || align=right | 1.3 km || 
|-id=500 bgcolor=#E9E9E9
| 347500 ||  || — || September 24, 1998 || Kitt Peak || Spacewatch || HEN || align=right data-sort-value="0.94" | 940 m || 
|}

347501–347600 

|-bgcolor=#E9E9E9
| 347501 ||  || — || September 25, 1998 || Kitt Peak || Spacewatch || — || align=right | 3.1 km || 
|-id=502 bgcolor=#fefefe
| 347502 ||  || — || October 16, 1998 || Kitt Peak || Spacewatch || FLO || align=right data-sort-value="0.57" | 570 m || 
|-id=503 bgcolor=#E9E9E9
| 347503 ||  || — || December 15, 1998 || Višnjan Observatory || K. Korlević || CLO || align=right | 3.1 km || 
|-id=504 bgcolor=#fefefe
| 347504 ||  || — || January 15, 1999 || Kitt Peak || Spacewatch || V || align=right data-sort-value="0.78" | 780 m || 
|-id=505 bgcolor=#FA8072
| 347505 ||  || — || February 11, 1999 || Socorro || LINEAR || — || align=right | 1.5 km || 
|-id=506 bgcolor=#fefefe
| 347506 ||  || — || April 12, 1999 || Kitt Peak || Spacewatch || — || align=right data-sort-value="0.96" | 960 m || 
|-id=507 bgcolor=#fefefe
| 347507 ||  || — || May 16, 1999 || Kitt Peak || Spacewatch || — || align=right data-sort-value="0.81" | 810 m || 
|-id=508 bgcolor=#E9E9E9
| 347508 ||  || — || September 7, 1999 || Socorro || LINEAR || RAF || align=right | 1.6 km || 
|-id=509 bgcolor=#FA8072
| 347509 ||  || — || September 8, 1999 || Socorro || LINEAR || — || align=right data-sort-value="0.62" | 620 m || 
|-id=510 bgcolor=#fefefe
| 347510 ||  || — || September 9, 1999 || Socorro || LINEAR || — || align=right data-sort-value="0.68" | 680 m || 
|-id=511 bgcolor=#E9E9E9
| 347511 ||  || — || September 9, 1999 || Socorro || LINEAR || — || align=right | 2.6 km || 
|-id=512 bgcolor=#E9E9E9
| 347512 ||  || — || September 8, 1999 || Socorro || LINEAR || MAR || align=right | 1.5 km || 
|-id=513 bgcolor=#E9E9E9
| 347513 ||  || — || September 4, 1999 || Catalina || CSS || — || align=right | 1.6 km || 
|-id=514 bgcolor=#FA8072
| 347514 ||  || — || September 29, 1999 || Catalina || CSS || — || align=right | 1.0 km || 
|-id=515 bgcolor=#E9E9E9
| 347515 ||  || — || October 2, 1999 || Socorro || LINEAR || — || align=right | 2.9 km || 
|-id=516 bgcolor=#E9E9E9
| 347516 ||  || — || October 4, 1999 || Socorro || LINEAR || — || align=right | 1.8 km || 
|-id=517 bgcolor=#E9E9E9
| 347517 ||  || — || October 4, 1999 || Kitt Peak || Spacewatch || EUN || align=right | 2.8 km || 
|-id=518 bgcolor=#E9E9E9
| 347518 ||  || — || October 7, 1999 || Kitt Peak || Spacewatch || — || align=right | 1.4 km || 
|-id=519 bgcolor=#fefefe
| 347519 ||  || — || October 1, 1999 || Kitt Peak || Spacewatch || — || align=right data-sort-value="0.73" | 730 m || 
|-id=520 bgcolor=#fefefe
| 347520 ||  || — || October 6, 1999 || Socorro || LINEAR || — || align=right data-sort-value="0.65" | 650 m || 
|-id=521 bgcolor=#E9E9E9
| 347521 ||  || — || October 4, 1999 || Socorro || LINEAR || — || align=right | 1.6 km || 
|-id=522 bgcolor=#E9E9E9
| 347522 ||  || — || October 6, 1999 || Socorro || LINEAR || — || align=right | 1.1 km || 
|-id=523 bgcolor=#E9E9E9
| 347523 ||  || — || October 7, 1999 || Socorro || LINEAR || — || align=right | 1.8 km || 
|-id=524 bgcolor=#d6d6d6
| 347524 ||  || — || October 14, 1999 || Socorro || LINEAR || EUP || align=right | 4.4 km || 
|-id=525 bgcolor=#d6d6d6
| 347525 ||  || — || October 15, 1999 || Socorro || LINEAR || Tj (2.98) || align=right | 4.1 km || 
|-id=526 bgcolor=#E9E9E9
| 347526 ||  || — || October 10, 1999 || Socorro || LINEAR || — || align=right | 1.2 km || 
|-id=527 bgcolor=#E9E9E9
| 347527 ||  || — || October 30, 1999 || Kitt Peak || Spacewatch || — || align=right | 1.5 km || 
|-id=528 bgcolor=#E9E9E9
| 347528 ||  || — || October 30, 1999 || Catalina || CSS || — || align=right | 1.8 km || 
|-id=529 bgcolor=#E9E9E9
| 347529 ||  || — || November 3, 1999 || Socorro || LINEAR || IAN || align=right | 1.5 km || 
|-id=530 bgcolor=#E9E9E9
| 347530 ||  || — || November 3, 1999 || Socorro || LINEAR || JUN || align=right | 1.4 km || 
|-id=531 bgcolor=#E9E9E9
| 347531 ||  || — || November 4, 1999 || Kitt Peak || Spacewatch || — || align=right data-sort-value="0.99" | 990 m || 
|-id=532 bgcolor=#E9E9E9
| 347532 ||  || — || November 28, 1999 || Kitt Peak || Spacewatch || — || align=right | 1.9 km || 
|-id=533 bgcolor=#E9E9E9
| 347533 ||  || — || December 7, 1999 || Socorro || LINEAR || — || align=right | 2.5 km || 
|-id=534 bgcolor=#fefefe
| 347534 ||  || — || December 12, 1999 || Socorro || LINEAR || H || align=right | 1.2 km || 
|-id=535 bgcolor=#E9E9E9
| 347535 ||  || — || December 12, 1999 || Socorro || LINEAR || — || align=right | 2.5 km || 
|-id=536 bgcolor=#E9E9E9
| 347536 ||  || — || December 8, 1999 || Kitt Peak || Spacewatch || — || align=right | 2.0 km || 
|-id=537 bgcolor=#E9E9E9
| 347537 ||  || — || December 31, 1999 || San Marcello || L. Tesi, G. Forti || — || align=right | 3.5 km || 
|-id=538 bgcolor=#FA8072
| 347538 ||  || — || January 2, 2000 || Socorro || LINEAR || — || align=right | 1.1 km || 
|-id=539 bgcolor=#E9E9E9
| 347539 ||  || — || January 3, 2000 || Socorro || LINEAR || — || align=right | 1.9 km || 
|-id=540 bgcolor=#fefefe
| 347540 ||  || — || December 15, 1999 || Socorro || LINEAR || H || align=right data-sort-value="0.86" | 860 m || 
|-id=541 bgcolor=#E9E9E9
| 347541 ||  || — || January 5, 2000 || Kitt Peak || Spacewatch || MAR || align=right | 1.1 km || 
|-id=542 bgcolor=#FA8072
| 347542 ||  || — || January 8, 2000 || Socorro || LINEAR || H || align=right | 1.2 km || 
|-id=543 bgcolor=#FA8072
| 347543 ||  || — || January 29, 2000 || Socorro || LINEAR || H || align=right | 1.0 km || 
|-id=544 bgcolor=#fefefe
| 347544 ||  || — || March 3, 2000 || Kitt Peak || Spacewatch || — || align=right data-sort-value="0.69" | 690 m || 
|-id=545 bgcolor=#E9E9E9
| 347545 ||  || — || March 3, 2000 || Socorro || LINEAR || — || align=right | 2.3 km || 
|-id=546 bgcolor=#E9E9E9
| 347546 ||  || — || March 11, 2000 || Socorro || LINEAR || MRX || align=right | 1.2 km || 
|-id=547 bgcolor=#fefefe
| 347547 ||  || — || July 24, 2000 || Kitt Peak || Spacewatch || — || align=right data-sort-value="0.94" | 940 m || 
|-id=548 bgcolor=#FA8072
| 347548 ||  || — || August 24, 2000 || Socorro || LINEAR || — || align=right data-sort-value="0.83" | 830 m || 
|-id=549 bgcolor=#d6d6d6
| 347549 ||  || — || September 22, 2000 || Socorro || LINEAR || — || align=right | 4.8 km || 
|-id=550 bgcolor=#fefefe
| 347550 ||  || — || September 24, 2000 || Socorro || LINEAR || MAS || align=right | 1.0 km || 
|-id=551 bgcolor=#fefefe
| 347551 ||  || — || September 26, 2000 || Socorro || LINEAR || — || align=right | 1.4 km || 
|-id=552 bgcolor=#fefefe
| 347552 ||  || — || September 28, 2000 || Socorro || LINEAR || — || align=right data-sort-value="0.97" | 970 m || 
|-id=553 bgcolor=#fefefe
| 347553 ||  || — || September 27, 2000 || Socorro || LINEAR || LCI || align=right | 1.7 km || 
|-id=554 bgcolor=#fefefe
| 347554 ||  || — || September 29, 2000 || Kitt Peak || Spacewatch || — || align=right | 1.2 km || 
|-id=555 bgcolor=#fefefe
| 347555 ||  || — || September 22, 2000 || Haleakala || NEAT || — || align=right | 1.4 km || 
|-id=556 bgcolor=#E9E9E9
| 347556 ||  || — || August 31, 2000 || Socorro || LINEAR || JUN || align=right | 1.4 km || 
|-id=557 bgcolor=#fefefe
| 347557 ||  || — || October 1, 2000 || Socorro || LINEAR || — || align=right | 1.6 km || 
|-id=558 bgcolor=#FA8072
| 347558 ||  || — || October 25, 2000 || Socorro || LINEAR || — || align=right | 1.5 km || 
|-id=559 bgcolor=#fefefe
| 347559 ||  || — || October 24, 2000 || Socorro || LINEAR || — || align=right | 1.4 km || 
|-id=560 bgcolor=#fefefe
| 347560 ||  || — || October 24, 2000 || Socorro || LINEAR || V || align=right | 1.1 km || 
|-id=561 bgcolor=#fefefe
| 347561 ||  || — || October 25, 2000 || Socorro || LINEAR || SUL || align=right | 2.7 km || 
|-id=562 bgcolor=#fefefe
| 347562 ||  || — || October 25, 2000 || Socorro || LINEAR || — || align=right | 1.7 km || 
|-id=563 bgcolor=#fefefe
| 347563 ||  || — || October 25, 2000 || Socorro || LINEAR || V || align=right | 1.1 km || 
|-id=564 bgcolor=#fefefe
| 347564 ||  || — || October 26, 2000 || Kitt Peak || Spacewatch || NYS || align=right data-sort-value="0.96" | 960 m || 
|-id=565 bgcolor=#d6d6d6
| 347565 ||  || — || November 1, 2000 || Kitt Peak || Spacewatch || — || align=right | 3.5 km || 
|-id=566 bgcolor=#E9E9E9
| 347566 ||  || — || November 1, 2000 || Socorro || LINEAR || — || align=right | 1.6 km || 
|-id=567 bgcolor=#FA8072
| 347567 ||  || — || November 25, 2000 || Socorro || LINEAR || — || align=right | 1.3 km || 
|-id=568 bgcolor=#fefefe
| 347568 ||  || — || November 20, 2000 || Socorro || LINEAR || SUL || align=right | 2.8 km || 
|-id=569 bgcolor=#E9E9E9
| 347569 ||  || — || November 19, 2000 || Kitt Peak || Spacewatch || — || align=right | 2.3 km || 
|-id=570 bgcolor=#E9E9E9
| 347570 ||  || — || December 5, 2000 || Socorro || LINEAR || — || align=right | 2.0 km || 
|-id=571 bgcolor=#E9E9E9
| 347571 ||  || — || December 30, 2000 || Socorro || LINEAR || — || align=right | 1.6 km || 
|-id=572 bgcolor=#E9E9E9
| 347572 ||  || — || December 30, 2000 || Socorro || LINEAR || BRU || align=right | 3.8 km || 
|-id=573 bgcolor=#E9E9E9
| 347573 ||  || — || December 30, 2000 || Socorro || LINEAR || — || align=right | 1.4 km || 
|-id=574 bgcolor=#E9E9E9
| 347574 ||  || — || December 30, 2000 || Socorro || LINEAR || — || align=right | 1.8 km || 
|-id=575 bgcolor=#E9E9E9
| 347575 ||  || — || January 2, 2001 || Socorro || LINEAR || — || align=right | 1.6 km || 
|-id=576 bgcolor=#E9E9E9
| 347576 ||  || — || January 5, 2001 || Socorro || LINEAR || — || align=right | 1.9 km || 
|-id=577 bgcolor=#E9E9E9
| 347577 ||  || — || January 15, 2001 || Socorro || LINEAR || — || align=right | 3.1 km || 
|-id=578 bgcolor=#C2FFFF
| 347578 ||  || — || December 22, 2000 || Kitt Peak || Spacewatch || L4 || align=right | 11 km || 
|-id=579 bgcolor=#E9E9E9
| 347579 ||  || — || January 16, 2001 || Bohyunsan || Bohyunsan Obs. || — || align=right | 1.4 km || 
|-id=580 bgcolor=#E9E9E9
| 347580 ||  || — || February 1, 2001 || Socorro || LINEAR || — || align=right | 1.6 km || 
|-id=581 bgcolor=#E9E9E9
| 347581 ||  || — || February 1, 2001 || Socorro || LINEAR || — || align=right | 1.7 km || 
|-id=582 bgcolor=#E9E9E9
| 347582 ||  || — || February 3, 2001 || Socorro || LINEAR || — || align=right | 1.3 km || 
|-id=583 bgcolor=#E9E9E9
| 347583 ||  || — || February 19, 2001 || Socorro || LINEAR || — || align=right | 1.7 km || 
|-id=584 bgcolor=#FA8072
| 347584 ||  || — || March 15, 2001 || Socorro || LINEAR || — || align=right | 2.1 km || 
|-id=585 bgcolor=#E9E9E9
| 347585 ||  || — || March 27, 2001 || Kitt Peak || Spacewatch || — || align=right data-sort-value="0.98" | 980 m || 
|-id=586 bgcolor=#E9E9E9
| 347586 ||  || — || March 16, 2001 || Socorro || LINEAR || — || align=right | 1.6 km || 
|-id=587 bgcolor=#fefefe
| 347587 ||  || — || March 16, 2001 || Socorro || LINEAR || — || align=right | 1.2 km || 
|-id=588 bgcolor=#E9E9E9
| 347588 ||  || — || March 24, 2001 || Kitt Peak || Spacewatch || JUN || align=right | 1.1 km || 
|-id=589 bgcolor=#E9E9E9
| 347589 ||  || — || April 15, 2001 || Haleakala || NEAT || — || align=right | 2.4 km || 
|-id=590 bgcolor=#fefefe
| 347590 ||  || — || July 13, 2001 || Palomar || NEAT || FLOcritical || align=right data-sort-value="0.67" | 670 m || 
|-id=591 bgcolor=#fefefe
| 347591 ||  || — || July 16, 2001 || Haleakala || NEAT || — || align=right | 1.0 km || 
|-id=592 bgcolor=#fefefe
| 347592 ||  || — || August 10, 2001 || Palomar || NEAT || — || align=right data-sort-value="0.94" | 940 m || 
|-id=593 bgcolor=#FA8072
| 347593 ||  || — || August 10, 2001 || Haleakala || NEAT || PHO || align=right | 1.3 km || 
|-id=594 bgcolor=#fefefe
| 347594 ||  || — || August 14, 2001 || Haleakala || NEAT || V || align=right data-sort-value="0.84" | 840 m || 
|-id=595 bgcolor=#E9E9E9
| 347595 ||  || — || August 16, 2001 || Socorro || LINEAR || — || align=right | 1.3 km || 
|-id=596 bgcolor=#fefefe
| 347596 ||  || — || August 17, 2001 || Socorro || LINEAR || — || align=right data-sort-value="0.91" | 910 m || 
|-id=597 bgcolor=#fefefe
| 347597 ||  || — || August 21, 2001 || Haleakala || NEAT || — || align=right | 1.2 km || 
|-id=598 bgcolor=#fefefe
| 347598 ||  || — || August 23, 2001 || Anderson Mesa || LONEOS || — || align=right | 1.0 km || 
|-id=599 bgcolor=#E9E9E9
| 347599 ||  || — || August 24, 2001 || Anderson Mesa || LONEOS || ADE || align=right | 2.1 km || 
|-id=600 bgcolor=#fefefe
| 347600 ||  || — || August 24, 2001 || Socorro || LINEAR || — || align=right data-sort-value="0.99" | 990 m || 
|}

347601–347700 

|-bgcolor=#fefefe
| 347601 ||  || — || August 19, 2001 || Socorro || LINEAR || — || align=right data-sort-value="0.86" | 860 m || 
|-id=602 bgcolor=#E9E9E9
| 347602 ||  || — || September 7, 2001 || Socorro || LINEAR || — || align=right | 1.7 km || 
|-id=603 bgcolor=#fefefe
| 347603 ||  || — || September 11, 2001 || Socorro || LINEAR || FLO || align=right data-sort-value="0.73" | 730 m || 
|-id=604 bgcolor=#d6d6d6
| 347604 ||  || — || September 10, 2001 || Socorro || LINEAR || MEL || align=right | 3.6 km || 
|-id=605 bgcolor=#fefefe
| 347605 ||  || — || September 12, 2001 || Socorro || LINEAR || — || align=right | 1.1 km || 
|-id=606 bgcolor=#E9E9E9
| 347606 ||  || — || September 10, 2001 || Socorro || LINEAR || JUN || align=right | 3.3 km || 
|-id=607 bgcolor=#d6d6d6
| 347607 ||  || — || September 12, 2001 || Socorro || LINEAR || — || align=right | 3.7 km || 
|-id=608 bgcolor=#fefefe
| 347608 ||  || — || September 12, 2001 || Socorro || LINEAR || MAS || align=right data-sort-value="0.78" | 780 m || 
|-id=609 bgcolor=#fefefe
| 347609 ||  || — || September 12, 2001 || Socorro || LINEAR || — || align=right data-sort-value="0.75" | 750 m || 
|-id=610 bgcolor=#d6d6d6
| 347610 ||  || — || August 12, 2001 || Palomar || NEAT || — || align=right | 3.0 km || 
|-id=611 bgcolor=#fefefe
| 347611 ||  || — || August 24, 2001 || Socorro || LINEAR || — || align=right data-sort-value="0.84" | 840 m || 
|-id=612 bgcolor=#E9E9E9
| 347612 ||  || — || September 12, 2001 || Socorro || LINEAR || — || align=right | 2.4 km || 
|-id=613 bgcolor=#fefefe
| 347613 ||  || — || September 11, 2001 || Anderson Mesa || LONEOS || FLO || align=right data-sort-value="0.69" | 690 m || 
|-id=614 bgcolor=#fefefe
| 347614 ||  || — || September 16, 2001 || Socorro || LINEAR || — || align=right data-sort-value="0.82" | 820 m || 
|-id=615 bgcolor=#E9E9E9
| 347615 ||  || — || September 16, 2001 || Socorro || LINEAR || — || align=right | 3.0 km || 
|-id=616 bgcolor=#fefefe
| 347616 ||  || — || September 16, 2001 || Socorro || LINEAR || — || align=right data-sort-value="0.90" | 900 m || 
|-id=617 bgcolor=#d6d6d6
| 347617 ||  || — || August 5, 2001 || Palomar || NEAT || — || align=right | 3.7 km || 
|-id=618 bgcolor=#fefefe
| 347618 ||  || — || September 16, 2001 || Socorro || LINEAR || — || align=right data-sort-value="0.94" | 940 m || 
|-id=619 bgcolor=#fefefe
| 347619 ||  || — || September 19, 2001 || Socorro || LINEAR || NYS || align=right data-sort-value="0.79" | 790 m || 
|-id=620 bgcolor=#fefefe
| 347620 ||  || — || September 20, 2001 || Socorro || LINEAR || — || align=right | 1.1 km || 
|-id=621 bgcolor=#d6d6d6
| 347621 ||  || — || September 20, 2001 || Desert Eagle || W. K. Y. Yeung || JLI || align=right | 4.0 km || 
|-id=622 bgcolor=#FA8072
| 347622 ||  || — || September 16, 2001 || Socorro || LINEAR || — || align=right data-sort-value="0.91" | 910 m || 
|-id=623 bgcolor=#fefefe
| 347623 ||  || — || September 16, 2001 || Socorro || LINEAR || NYS || align=right data-sort-value="0.96" | 960 m || 
|-id=624 bgcolor=#fefefe
| 347624 ||  || — || September 16, 2001 || Socorro || LINEAR || FLO || align=right data-sort-value="0.75" | 750 m || 
|-id=625 bgcolor=#fefefe
| 347625 ||  || — || September 16, 2001 || Socorro || LINEAR || — || align=right data-sort-value="0.97" | 970 m || 
|-id=626 bgcolor=#fefefe
| 347626 ||  || — || September 16, 2001 || Socorro || LINEAR || V || align=right data-sort-value="0.68" | 680 m || 
|-id=627 bgcolor=#d6d6d6
| 347627 ||  || — || September 16, 2001 || Socorro || LINEAR || — || align=right | 3.6 km || 
|-id=628 bgcolor=#fefefe
| 347628 ||  || — || September 17, 2001 || Socorro || LINEAR || NYS || align=right data-sort-value="0.68" | 680 m || 
|-id=629 bgcolor=#E9E9E9
| 347629 ||  || — || September 16, 2001 || Socorro || LINEAR || — || align=right | 3.0 km || 
|-id=630 bgcolor=#fefefe
| 347630 ||  || — || May 22, 2001 || Cerro Tololo || M. W. Buie || MAS || align=right data-sort-value="0.62" | 620 m || 
|-id=631 bgcolor=#fefefe
| 347631 ||  || — || September 19, 2001 || Socorro || LINEAR || FLO || align=right data-sort-value="0.69" | 690 m || 
|-id=632 bgcolor=#fefefe
| 347632 ||  || — || September 19, 2001 || Socorro || LINEAR || EUT || align=right data-sort-value="0.71" | 710 m || 
|-id=633 bgcolor=#E9E9E9
| 347633 ||  || — || September 16, 2001 || Socorro || LINEAR || JUN || align=right | 1.0 km || 
|-id=634 bgcolor=#FFC2E0
| 347634 ||  || — || September 21, 2001 || Socorro || LINEAR || APO || align=right data-sort-value="0.43" | 430 m || 
|-id=635 bgcolor=#FA8072
| 347635 ||  || — || September 21, 2001 || Anderson Mesa || LONEOS || — || align=right data-sort-value="0.87" | 870 m || 
|-id=636 bgcolor=#fefefe
| 347636 ||  || — || September 20, 2001 || Socorro || LINEAR || — || align=right | 1.1 km || 
|-id=637 bgcolor=#fefefe
| 347637 ||  || — || September 20, 2001 || Socorro || LINEAR || — || align=right | 1.1 km || 
|-id=638 bgcolor=#fefefe
| 347638 ||  || — || September 18, 2001 || Anderson Mesa || LONEOS || V || align=right data-sort-value="0.74" | 740 m || 
|-id=639 bgcolor=#d6d6d6
| 347639 ||  || — || September 21, 2001 || Anderson Mesa || LONEOS || THB || align=right | 3.3 km || 
|-id=640 bgcolor=#fefefe
| 347640 ||  || — || October 10, 2001 || Kitt Peak || Spacewatch || MAS || align=right data-sort-value="0.57" | 570 m || 
|-id=641 bgcolor=#E9E9E9
| 347641 ||  || — || October 7, 2001 || Palomar || NEAT || MRX || align=right | 1.5 km || 
|-id=642 bgcolor=#fefefe
| 347642 ||  || — || October 13, 2001 || Socorro || LINEAR || V || align=right data-sort-value="0.84" | 840 m || 
|-id=643 bgcolor=#d6d6d6
| 347643 ||  || — || October 14, 2001 || Socorro || LINEAR || — || align=right | 3.0 km || 
|-id=644 bgcolor=#E9E9E9
| 347644 ||  || — || October 14, 2001 || Desert Eagle || W. K. Y. Yeung || ADE || align=right | 2.6 km || 
|-id=645 bgcolor=#fefefe
| 347645 ||  || — || October 13, 2001 || Socorro || LINEAR || NYS || align=right data-sort-value="0.69" | 690 m || 
|-id=646 bgcolor=#E9E9E9
| 347646 ||  || — || October 14, 2001 || Socorro || LINEAR || GEF || align=right | 1.6 km || 
|-id=647 bgcolor=#fefefe
| 347647 ||  || — || October 13, 2001 || Socorro || LINEAR || — || align=right | 1.2 km || 
|-id=648 bgcolor=#fefefe
| 347648 ||  || — || October 13, 2001 || Socorro || LINEAR || ERI || align=right | 1.8 km || 
|-id=649 bgcolor=#fefefe
| 347649 ||  || — || September 19, 2001 || Socorro || LINEAR || — || align=right | 1.4 km || 
|-id=650 bgcolor=#d6d6d6
| 347650 ||  || — || September 17, 2001 || Socorro || LINEAR || — || align=right | 4.1 km || 
|-id=651 bgcolor=#fefefe
| 347651 ||  || — || October 14, 2001 || Socorro || LINEAR || ERI || align=right | 1.7 km || 
|-id=652 bgcolor=#d6d6d6
| 347652 ||  || — || October 14, 2001 || Socorro || LINEAR || — || align=right | 3.8 km || 
|-id=653 bgcolor=#d6d6d6
| 347653 ||  || — || October 13, 2001 || Kitt Peak || Spacewatch || — || align=right | 2.8 km || 
|-id=654 bgcolor=#fefefe
| 347654 ||  || — || October 8, 2001 || Palomar || NEAT || ERI || align=right | 1.7 km || 
|-id=655 bgcolor=#d6d6d6
| 347655 ||  || — || October 13, 2001 || Palomar || NEAT || — || align=right | 3.3 km || 
|-id=656 bgcolor=#d6d6d6
| 347656 ||  || — || October 13, 2001 || Kitt Peak || Spacewatch || — || align=right | 2.5 km || 
|-id=657 bgcolor=#fefefe
| 347657 ||  || — || October 14, 2001 || Socorro || LINEAR || NYS || align=right data-sort-value="0.93" | 930 m || 
|-id=658 bgcolor=#d6d6d6
| 347658 ||  || — || October 14, 2001 || Socorro || LINEAR || — || align=right | 3.0 km || 
|-id=659 bgcolor=#fefefe
| 347659 ||  || — || October 14, 2001 || Socorro || LINEAR || NYS || align=right data-sort-value="0.60" | 600 m || 
|-id=660 bgcolor=#fefefe
| 347660 ||  || — || October 14, 2001 || Socorro || LINEAR || — || align=right data-sort-value="0.89" | 890 m || 
|-id=661 bgcolor=#fefefe
| 347661 ||  || — || September 12, 2001 || Socorro || LINEAR || — || align=right data-sort-value="0.99" | 990 m || 
|-id=662 bgcolor=#d6d6d6
| 347662 ||  || — || October 11, 2001 || Socorro || LINEAR || — || align=right | 2.9 km || 
|-id=663 bgcolor=#d6d6d6
| 347663 ||  || — || October 11, 2001 || Socorro || LINEAR || — || align=right | 3.0 km || 
|-id=664 bgcolor=#fefefe
| 347664 ||  || — || October 13, 2001 || Palomar || NEAT || — || align=right | 1.1 km || 
|-id=665 bgcolor=#fefefe
| 347665 ||  || — || October 14, 2001 || Palomar || NEAT || — || align=right data-sort-value="0.94" | 940 m || 
|-id=666 bgcolor=#d6d6d6
| 347666 ||  || — || October 11, 2001 || Palomar || NEAT || — || align=right | 2.9 km || 
|-id=667 bgcolor=#fefefe
| 347667 ||  || — || April 20, 2007 || Kitt Peak || Spacewatch || — || align=right data-sort-value="0.90" | 900 m || 
|-id=668 bgcolor=#d6d6d6
| 347668 ||  || — || October 14, 2001 || Anderson Mesa || LONEOS || — || align=right | 4.1 km || 
|-id=669 bgcolor=#fefefe
| 347669 ||  || — || October 24, 2001 || Desert Eagle || W. K. Y. Yeung || ERI || align=right | 1.8 km || 
|-id=670 bgcolor=#fefefe
| 347670 ||  || — || October 18, 2001 || Socorro || LINEAR || — || align=right | 1.0 km || 
|-id=671 bgcolor=#fefefe
| 347671 ||  || — || October 17, 2001 || Socorro || LINEAR || — || align=right data-sort-value="0.90" | 900 m || 
|-id=672 bgcolor=#d6d6d6
| 347672 ||  || — || October 16, 2001 || Socorro || LINEAR || — || align=right | 4.2 km || 
|-id=673 bgcolor=#fefefe
| 347673 ||  || — || October 17, 2001 || Socorro || LINEAR || FLO || align=right data-sort-value="0.88" | 880 m || 
|-id=674 bgcolor=#d6d6d6
| 347674 ||  || — || October 17, 2001 || Kitt Peak || Spacewatch || — || align=right | 2.5 km || 
|-id=675 bgcolor=#d6d6d6
| 347675 ||  || — || September 22, 2001 || Kitt Peak || Spacewatch || — || align=right | 2.9 km || 
|-id=676 bgcolor=#fefefe
| 347676 ||  || — || October 19, 2001 || Haleakala || NEAT || — || align=right | 1.3 km || 
|-id=677 bgcolor=#fefefe
| 347677 ||  || — || October 17, 2001 || Socorro || LINEAR || — || align=right data-sort-value="0.73" | 730 m || 
|-id=678 bgcolor=#d6d6d6
| 347678 ||  || — || October 22, 2001 || Socorro || LINEAR || — || align=right | 3.3 km || 
|-id=679 bgcolor=#d6d6d6
| 347679 ||  || — || October 21, 2001 || Socorro || LINEAR || — || align=right | 2.5 km || 
|-id=680 bgcolor=#fefefe
| 347680 ||  || — || October 23, 2001 || Socorro || LINEAR || — || align=right data-sort-value="0.69" | 690 m || 
|-id=681 bgcolor=#fefefe
| 347681 ||  || — || October 18, 2001 || Palomar || NEAT || V || align=right | 1.0 km || 
|-id=682 bgcolor=#E9E9E9
| 347682 ||  || — || October 23, 2001 || Palomar || NEAT || — || align=right | 4.4 km || 
|-id=683 bgcolor=#fefefe
| 347683 ||  || — || October 18, 2001 || Palomar || NEAT || EUT || align=right data-sort-value="0.60" | 600 m || 
|-id=684 bgcolor=#fefefe
| 347684 ||  || — || October 17, 2001 || Socorro || LINEAR || V || align=right | 1.0 km || 
|-id=685 bgcolor=#fefefe
| 347685 ||  || — || October 20, 2001 || Kitt Peak || Spacewatch || NYS || align=right data-sort-value="0.58" | 580 m || 
|-id=686 bgcolor=#fefefe
| 347686 ||  || — || November 9, 2001 || Socorro || LINEAR || MAS || align=right data-sort-value="0.86" | 860 m || 
|-id=687 bgcolor=#fefefe
| 347687 ||  || — || November 9, 2001 || Socorro || LINEAR || NYS || align=right data-sort-value="0.82" | 820 m || 
|-id=688 bgcolor=#d6d6d6
| 347688 ||  || — || November 10, 2001 || Socorro || LINEAR || — || align=right | 4.3 km || 
|-id=689 bgcolor=#fefefe
| 347689 ||  || — || November 9, 2001 || Socorro || LINEAR || NYS || align=right data-sort-value="0.79" | 790 m || 
|-id=690 bgcolor=#fefefe
| 347690 ||  || — || November 9, 2001 || Socorro || LINEAR || — || align=right data-sort-value="0.74" | 740 m || 
|-id=691 bgcolor=#fefefe
| 347691 ||  || — || November 11, 2001 || Kitt Peak || Spacewatch || MAS || align=right data-sort-value="0.82" | 820 m || 
|-id=692 bgcolor=#fefefe
| 347692 ||  || — || November 13, 2001 || Socorro || LINEAR || H || align=right | 1.1 km || 
|-id=693 bgcolor=#fefefe
| 347693 ||  || — || November 9, 2001 || Palomar || NEAT || NYS || align=right data-sort-value="0.86" | 860 m || 
|-id=694 bgcolor=#d6d6d6
| 347694 ||  || — || November 15, 2001 || Socorro || LINEAR || MEL || align=right | 3.9 km || 
|-id=695 bgcolor=#fefefe
| 347695 ||  || — || November 12, 2001 || Socorro || LINEAR || — || align=right | 1.1 km || 
|-id=696 bgcolor=#d6d6d6
| 347696 ||  || — || November 11, 2001 || Apache Point || SDSS || — || align=right | 2.9 km || 
|-id=697 bgcolor=#fefefe
| 347697 ||  || — || November 12, 2001 || Apache Point || SDSS || — || align=right | 1.1 km || 
|-id=698 bgcolor=#fefefe
| 347698 ||  || — || November 17, 2001 || Socorro || LINEAR || H || align=right data-sort-value="0.94" | 940 m || 
|-id=699 bgcolor=#fefefe
| 347699 ||  || — || November 17, 2001 || Socorro || LINEAR || — || align=right | 1.1 km || 
|-id=700 bgcolor=#fefefe
| 347700 ||  || — || November 17, 2001 || Socorro || LINEAR || — || align=right data-sort-value="0.96" | 960 m || 
|}

347701–347800 

|-bgcolor=#fefefe
| 347701 ||  || — || November 17, 2001 || Socorro || LINEAR || FLO || align=right data-sort-value="0.91" | 910 m || 
|-id=702 bgcolor=#d6d6d6
| 347702 ||  || — || November 17, 2001 || Socorro || LINEAR || — || align=right | 3.4 km || 
|-id=703 bgcolor=#d6d6d6
| 347703 ||  || — || November 18, 2001 || Socorro || LINEAR || — || align=right | 3.4 km || 
|-id=704 bgcolor=#fefefe
| 347704 ||  || — || November 17, 2001 || Socorro || LINEAR || — || align=right | 1.2 km || 
|-id=705 bgcolor=#d6d6d6
| 347705 ||  || — || October 23, 2001 || Socorro || LINEAR || — || align=right | 3.5 km || 
|-id=706 bgcolor=#fefefe
| 347706 ||  || — || October 13, 2001 || Kitt Peak || Spacewatch || MAS || align=right data-sort-value="0.68" | 680 m || 
|-id=707 bgcolor=#fefefe
| 347707 ||  || — || December 9, 2001 || Socorro || LINEAR || H || align=right | 1.2 km || 
|-id=708 bgcolor=#fefefe
| 347708 ||  || — || December 10, 2001 || Socorro || LINEAR || — || align=right data-sort-value="0.94" | 940 m || 
|-id=709 bgcolor=#d6d6d6
| 347709 ||  || — || December 10, 2001 || Socorro || LINEAR || — || align=right | 4.4 km || 
|-id=710 bgcolor=#d6d6d6
| 347710 ||  || — || December 9, 2001 || Socorro || LINEAR || ALA || align=right | 5.2 km || 
|-id=711 bgcolor=#d6d6d6
| 347711 ||  || — || December 10, 2001 || Socorro || LINEAR || — || align=right | 3.7 km || 
|-id=712 bgcolor=#d6d6d6
| 347712 ||  || — || December 10, 2001 || Socorro || LINEAR || — || align=right | 4.1 km || 
|-id=713 bgcolor=#fefefe
| 347713 ||  || — || December 11, 2001 || Socorro || LINEAR || — || align=right | 1.2 km || 
|-id=714 bgcolor=#fefefe
| 347714 ||  || — || December 11, 2001 || Socorro || LINEAR || — || align=right | 1.1 km || 
|-id=715 bgcolor=#d6d6d6
| 347715 ||  || — || December 11, 2001 || Socorro || LINEAR || — || align=right | 3.5 km || 
|-id=716 bgcolor=#d6d6d6
| 347716 ||  || — || December 11, 2001 || Socorro || LINEAR || — || align=right | 3.2 km || 
|-id=717 bgcolor=#fefefe
| 347717 ||  || — || December 10, 2001 || Socorro || LINEAR || NYS || align=right data-sort-value="0.79" | 790 m || 
|-id=718 bgcolor=#fefefe
| 347718 ||  || — || December 11, 2001 || Socorro || LINEAR || H || align=right data-sort-value="0.96" | 960 m || 
|-id=719 bgcolor=#d6d6d6
| 347719 ||  || — || December 13, 2001 || Socorro || LINEAR || — || align=right | 3.1 km || 
|-id=720 bgcolor=#fefefe
| 347720 ||  || — || December 14, 2001 || Socorro || LINEAR || — || align=right data-sort-value="0.94" | 940 m || 
|-id=721 bgcolor=#d6d6d6
| 347721 ||  || — || December 14, 2001 || Socorro || LINEAR || HYG || align=right | 3.6 km || 
|-id=722 bgcolor=#d6d6d6
| 347722 ||  || — || December 14, 2001 || Socorro || LINEAR || — || align=right | 4.9 km || 
|-id=723 bgcolor=#d6d6d6
| 347723 ||  || — || December 14, 2001 || Socorro || LINEAR || — || align=right | 4.8 km || 
|-id=724 bgcolor=#fefefe
| 347724 ||  || — || December 11, 2001 || Socorro || LINEAR || — || align=right | 1.1 km || 
|-id=725 bgcolor=#d6d6d6
| 347725 ||  || — || December 11, 2001 || Socorro || LINEAR || — || align=right | 3.7 km || 
|-id=726 bgcolor=#d6d6d6
| 347726 ||  || — || December 15, 2001 || Socorro || LINEAR || — || align=right | 3.9 km || 
|-id=727 bgcolor=#fefefe
| 347727 ||  || — || December 14, 2001 || Kitt Peak || Spacewatch || FLO || align=right data-sort-value="0.99" | 990 m || 
|-id=728 bgcolor=#fefefe
| 347728 ||  || — || December 10, 2001 || Kitt Peak || Spacewatch || FLO || align=right data-sort-value="0.84" | 840 m || 
|-id=729 bgcolor=#d6d6d6
| 347729 ||  || — || December 9, 2001 || Socorro || LINEAR || — || align=right | 3.6 km || 
|-id=730 bgcolor=#fefefe
| 347730 ||  || — || December 17, 2001 || Socorro || LINEAR || H || align=right data-sort-value="0.99" | 990 m || 
|-id=731 bgcolor=#d6d6d6
| 347731 ||  || — || December 23, 2001 || Kingsnake || J. V. McClusky || — || align=right | 3.4 km || 
|-id=732 bgcolor=#d6d6d6
| 347732 ||  || — || December 18, 2001 || Socorro || LINEAR || TIR || align=right | 3.2 km || 
|-id=733 bgcolor=#d6d6d6
| 347733 ||  || — || December 17, 2001 || Palomar || NEAT || TIR || align=right | 3.8 km || 
|-id=734 bgcolor=#d6d6d6
| 347734 ||  || — || December 19, 2001 || Kitt Peak || Spacewatch || — || align=right | 3.4 km || 
|-id=735 bgcolor=#d6d6d6
| 347735 ||  || — || December 17, 2001 || Socorro || LINEAR || TIR || align=right | 3.5 km || 
|-id=736 bgcolor=#E9E9E9
| 347736 ||  || — || December 19, 2001 || Socorro || LINEAR || — || align=right | 1.7 km || 
|-id=737 bgcolor=#fefefe
| 347737 ||  || — || January 10, 2002 || Campo Imperatore || CINEOS || MAS || align=right data-sort-value="0.85" | 850 m || 
|-id=738 bgcolor=#d6d6d6
| 347738 ||  || — || January 9, 2002 || Socorro || LINEAR || ELF || align=right | 5.2 km || 
|-id=739 bgcolor=#d6d6d6
| 347739 ||  || — || January 9, 2002 || Socorro || LINEAR || — || align=right | 3.9 km || 
|-id=740 bgcolor=#fefefe
| 347740 ||  || — || January 9, 2002 || Socorro || LINEAR || V || align=right data-sort-value="0.98" | 980 m || 
|-id=741 bgcolor=#d6d6d6
| 347741 ||  || — || January 9, 2002 || Socorro || LINEAR || — || align=right | 4.4 km || 
|-id=742 bgcolor=#d6d6d6
| 347742 ||  || — || January 9, 2002 || Socorro || LINEAR || — || align=right | 4.7 km || 
|-id=743 bgcolor=#d6d6d6
| 347743 ||  || — || January 9, 2002 || Socorro || LINEAR || EUP || align=right | 6.7 km || 
|-id=744 bgcolor=#d6d6d6
| 347744 ||  || — || January 8, 2002 || Socorro || LINEAR || EOS || align=right | 2.8 km || 
|-id=745 bgcolor=#d6d6d6
| 347745 ||  || — || January 8, 2002 || Socorro || LINEAR || — || align=right | 3.8 km || 
|-id=746 bgcolor=#E9E9E9
| 347746 ||  || — || January 6, 2002 || Kitt Peak || Spacewatch || — || align=right | 1.3 km || 
|-id=747 bgcolor=#d6d6d6
| 347747 ||  || — || January 9, 2002 || Socorro || LINEAR || LIX || align=right | 4.1 km || 
|-id=748 bgcolor=#d6d6d6
| 347748 ||  || — || January 9, 2002 || Socorro || LINEAR || — || align=right | 3.5 km || 
|-id=749 bgcolor=#d6d6d6
| 347749 ||  || — || January 15, 2002 || Kingsnake || J. V. McClusky || Tj (2.97) || align=right | 3.4 km || 
|-id=750 bgcolor=#fefefe
| 347750 ||  || — || January 13, 2002 || Socorro || LINEAR || V || align=right data-sort-value="0.78" | 780 m || 
|-id=751 bgcolor=#d6d6d6
| 347751 ||  || — || January 13, 2002 || Socorro || LINEAR || — || align=right | 3.1 km || 
|-id=752 bgcolor=#fefefe
| 347752 ||  || — || January 14, 2002 || Socorro || LINEAR || — || align=right data-sort-value="0.87" | 870 m || 
|-id=753 bgcolor=#d6d6d6
| 347753 ||  || — || January 13, 2002 || Socorro || LINEAR || LUT || align=right | 6.0 km || 
|-id=754 bgcolor=#d6d6d6
| 347754 ||  || — || January 5, 2002 || Palomar || NEAT || LIX || align=right | 4.8 km || 
|-id=755 bgcolor=#d6d6d6
| 347755 ||  || — || January 6, 2002 || Palomar || NEAT || — || align=right | 2.9 km || 
|-id=756 bgcolor=#fefefe
| 347756 ||  || — || January 8, 2002 || Socorro || LINEAR || H || align=right data-sort-value="0.98" | 980 m || 
|-id=757 bgcolor=#fefefe
| 347757 ||  || — || January 9, 2002 || Socorro || LINEAR || ERI || align=right | 2.1 km || 
|-id=758 bgcolor=#fefefe
| 347758 ||  || — || January 18, 2002 || Socorro || LINEAR || — || align=right | 2.0 km || 
|-id=759 bgcolor=#d6d6d6
| 347759 ||  || — || January 23, 2002 || Socorro || LINEAR || Tj (2.99) || align=right | 4.1 km || 
|-id=760 bgcolor=#d6d6d6
| 347760 ||  || — || January 20, 2002 || Anderson Mesa || LONEOS || TIR || align=right | 3.6 km || 
|-id=761 bgcolor=#d6d6d6
| 347761 ||  || — || February 5, 2002 || Palomar || NEAT || — || align=right | 3.9 km || 
|-id=762 bgcolor=#fefefe
| 347762 ||  || — || February 7, 2002 || Socorro || LINEAR || PHO || align=right | 1.3 km || 
|-id=763 bgcolor=#fefefe
| 347763 ||  || — || February 6, 2002 || Socorro || LINEAR || — || align=right | 1.1 km || 
|-id=764 bgcolor=#E9E9E9
| 347764 ||  || — || February 7, 2002 || Socorro || LINEAR || — || align=right | 3.3 km || 
|-id=765 bgcolor=#fefefe
| 347765 ||  || — || February 7, 2002 || Socorro || LINEAR || — || align=right | 1.0 km || 
|-id=766 bgcolor=#d6d6d6
| 347766 ||  || — || February 7, 2002 || Socorro || LINEAR || — || align=right | 5.3 km || 
|-id=767 bgcolor=#fefefe
| 347767 ||  || — || February 7, 2002 || Socorro || LINEAR || NYS || align=right data-sort-value="0.81" | 810 m || 
|-id=768 bgcolor=#fefefe
| 347768 ||  || — || February 15, 2002 || Ondřejov || P. Pravec || — || align=right data-sort-value="0.81" | 810 m || 
|-id=769 bgcolor=#fefefe
| 347769 ||  || — || February 10, 2002 || Socorro || LINEAR || — || align=right | 1.00 km || 
|-id=770 bgcolor=#d6d6d6
| 347770 ||  || — || February 7, 2002 || Socorro || LINEAR || — || align=right | 3.7 km || 
|-id=771 bgcolor=#fefefe
| 347771 ||  || — || February 8, 2002 || Socorro || LINEAR || — || align=right data-sort-value="0.88" | 880 m || 
|-id=772 bgcolor=#d6d6d6
| 347772 ||  || — || February 10, 2002 || Socorro || LINEAR || — || align=right | 3.6 km || 
|-id=773 bgcolor=#d6d6d6
| 347773 ||  || — || February 10, 2002 || Socorro || LINEAR || VER || align=right | 3.2 km || 
|-id=774 bgcolor=#d6d6d6
| 347774 ||  || — || February 10, 2002 || Socorro || LINEAR || — || align=right | 4.1 km || 
|-id=775 bgcolor=#fefefe
| 347775 ||  || — || February 10, 2002 || Socorro || LINEAR || — || align=right data-sort-value="0.96" | 960 m || 
|-id=776 bgcolor=#fefefe
| 347776 ||  || — || February 10, 2002 || Socorro || LINEAR || — || align=right data-sort-value="0.96" | 960 m || 
|-id=777 bgcolor=#fefefe
| 347777 ||  || — || January 13, 2002 || Desert Eagle || W. K. Y. Yeung || — || align=right data-sort-value="0.95" | 950 m || 
|-id=778 bgcolor=#fefefe
| 347778 ||  || — || February 8, 2002 || Socorro || LINEAR || H || align=right | 1.1 km || 
|-id=779 bgcolor=#fefefe
| 347779 ||  || — || February 11, 2002 || Socorro || LINEAR || — || align=right data-sort-value="0.86" | 860 m || 
|-id=780 bgcolor=#fefefe
| 347780 ||  || — || February 9, 2002 || Kitt Peak || Spacewatch || — || align=right | 1.3 km || 
|-id=781 bgcolor=#fefefe
| 347781 ||  || — || February 9, 2002 || Kitt Peak || Spacewatch || V || align=right data-sort-value="0.85" | 850 m || 
|-id=782 bgcolor=#E9E9E9
| 347782 ||  || — || February 9, 2002 || Desert Eagle || W. K. Y. Yeung || — || align=right | 2.5 km || 
|-id=783 bgcolor=#d6d6d6
| 347783 ||  || — || February 9, 2002 || Palomar || NEAT || EUP || align=right | 6.6 km || 
|-id=784 bgcolor=#d6d6d6
| 347784 ||  || — || February 21, 2002 || Socorro || LINEAR || — || align=right | 4.6 km || 
|-id=785 bgcolor=#d6d6d6
| 347785 ||  || — || February 19, 2002 || Socorro || LINEAR || — || align=right | 4.1 km || 
|-id=786 bgcolor=#E9E9E9
| 347786 ||  || — || March 6, 2002 || Siding Spring || R. H. McNaught || — || align=right | 1.2 km || 
|-id=787 bgcolor=#fefefe
| 347787 ||  || — || March 6, 2002 || Socorro || LINEAR || — || align=right | 1.3 km || 
|-id=788 bgcolor=#fefefe
| 347788 ||  || — || March 15, 2002 || Palomar || NEAT || — || align=right data-sort-value="0.99" | 990 m || 
|-id=789 bgcolor=#fefefe
| 347789 ||  || — || March 15, 2002 || Palomar || NEAT || MAS || align=right data-sort-value="0.91" | 910 m || 
|-id=790 bgcolor=#d6d6d6
| 347790 ||  || — || March 19, 2002 || Palomar || NEAT || TIR || align=right | 4.2 km || 
|-id=791 bgcolor=#E9E9E9
| 347791 ||  || — || April 4, 2002 || Haleakala || NEAT || — || align=right | 1.4 km || 
|-id=792 bgcolor=#d6d6d6
| 347792 ||  || — || April 12, 2002 || Palomar || NEAT || EUP || align=right | 3.3 km || 
|-id=793 bgcolor=#d6d6d6
| 347793 ||  || — || April 10, 2002 || Palomar || NEAT || TIR || align=right | 2.8 km || 
|-id=794 bgcolor=#E9E9E9
| 347794 ||  || — || April 9, 2002 || Palomar || NEAT || — || align=right | 1.2 km || 
|-id=795 bgcolor=#E9E9E9
| 347795 ||  || — || April 9, 2002 || Palomar || NEAT || — || align=right | 1.3 km || 
|-id=796 bgcolor=#E9E9E9
| 347796 ||  || — || April 9, 2002 || Palomar || NEAT || — || align=right | 1.1 km || 
|-id=797 bgcolor=#E9E9E9
| 347797 ||  || — || April 9, 2002 || Palomar || NEAT || — || align=right | 1.3 km || 
|-id=798 bgcolor=#E9E9E9
| 347798 ||  || — || September 20, 2003 || Kitt Peak || Spacewatch || — || align=right | 3.1 km || 
|-id=799 bgcolor=#fefefe
| 347799 ||  || — || April 19, 2006 || Kitt Peak || Spacewatch || — || align=right | 1.0 km || 
|-id=800 bgcolor=#fefefe
| 347800 ||  || — || May 7, 2002 || Palomar || NEAT || NYS || align=right data-sort-value="0.91" | 910 m || 
|}

347801–347900 

|-bgcolor=#fefefe
| 347801 ||  || — || April 16, 2002 || Socorro || LINEAR || H || align=right data-sort-value="0.87" | 870 m || 
|-id=802 bgcolor=#E9E9E9
| 347802 ||  || — || May 9, 2002 || Socorro || LINEAR || — || align=right | 2.0 km || 
|-id=803 bgcolor=#FA8072
| 347803 ||  || — || May 9, 2002 || Socorro || LINEAR || — || align=right | 2.6 km || 
|-id=804 bgcolor=#E9E9E9
| 347804 ||  || — || May 11, 2002 || Socorro || LINEAR || — || align=right | 2.0 km || 
|-id=805 bgcolor=#fefefe
| 347805 ||  || — || May 11, 2002 || Socorro || LINEAR || — || align=right | 1.0 km || 
|-id=806 bgcolor=#E9E9E9
| 347806 ||  || — || May 9, 2002 || Palomar || NEAT || ADE || align=right | 2.4 km || 
|-id=807 bgcolor=#E9E9E9
| 347807 ||  || — || May 7, 2002 || Palomar || NEAT || MAR || align=right | 1.5 km || 
|-id=808 bgcolor=#fefefe
| 347808 ||  || — || May 15, 2002 || Socorro || LINEAR || H || align=right data-sort-value="0.95" | 950 m || 
|-id=809 bgcolor=#E9E9E9
| 347809 ||  || — || June 10, 2002 || Socorro || LINEAR || GER || align=right | 2.4 km || 
|-id=810 bgcolor=#E9E9E9
| 347810 ||  || — || June 10, 2002 || Socorro || LINEAR || — || align=right | 2.0 km || 
|-id=811 bgcolor=#E9E9E9
| 347811 ||  || — || June 13, 2002 || Palomar || NEAT || — || align=right | 1.5 km || 
|-id=812 bgcolor=#FA8072
| 347812 ||  || — || June 25, 2002 || Haleakala || NEAT || — || align=right | 3.0 km || 
|-id=813 bgcolor=#FFC2E0
| 347813 ||  || — || July 5, 2002 || Socorro || LINEAR || AMO +1km || align=right | 1.0 km || 
|-id=814 bgcolor=#E9E9E9
| 347814 ||  || — || July 9, 2002 || Socorro || LINEAR || — || align=right | 3.5 km || 
|-id=815 bgcolor=#E9E9E9
| 347815 ||  || — || July 14, 2002 || Palomar || NEAT || — || align=right | 2.1 km || 
|-id=816 bgcolor=#fefefe
| 347816 ||  || — || July 9, 2002 || Palomar || NEAT || — || align=right data-sort-value="0.63" | 630 m || 
|-id=817 bgcolor=#E9E9E9
| 347817 ||  || — || December 20, 2004 || Mount Lemmon || Mount Lemmon Survey || — || align=right | 2.3 km || 
|-id=818 bgcolor=#fefefe
| 347818 ||  || — || July 20, 2002 || Palomar || NEAT || — || align=right data-sort-value="0.75" | 750 m || 
|-id=819 bgcolor=#E9E9E9
| 347819 ||  || — || July 20, 2002 || Palomar || NEAT || — || align=right | 2.1 km || 
|-id=820 bgcolor=#E9E9E9
| 347820 ||  || — || July 18, 2002 || Socorro || LINEAR || — || align=right | 2.4 km || 
|-id=821 bgcolor=#E9E9E9
| 347821 ||  || — || July 30, 2002 || Haleakala || S. F. Hönig || — || align=right | 3.8 km || 
|-id=822 bgcolor=#E9E9E9
| 347822 ||  || — || July 17, 2002 || Palomar || NEAT || AEO || align=right | 1.1 km || 
|-id=823 bgcolor=#E9E9E9
| 347823 ||  || — || January 29, 2009 || Mount Lemmon || Mount Lemmon Survey || — || align=right | 1.9 km || 
|-id=824 bgcolor=#E9E9E9
| 347824 ||  || — || October 31, 2007 || Catalina || CSS || — || align=right | 4.1 km || 
|-id=825 bgcolor=#E9E9E9
| 347825 ||  || — || August 3, 2002 || Palomar || NEAT || ADE || align=right | 3.6 km || 
|-id=826 bgcolor=#E9E9E9
| 347826 ||  || — || July 18, 2002 || Socorro || LINEAR || — || align=right | 2.8 km || 
|-id=827 bgcolor=#E9E9E9
| 347827 ||  || — || August 6, 2002 || Palomar || NEAT || — || align=right | 2.5 km || 
|-id=828 bgcolor=#E9E9E9
| 347828 ||  || — || August 6, 2002 || Palomar || NEAT || — || align=right | 3.5 km || 
|-id=829 bgcolor=#d6d6d6
| 347829 ||  || — || August 6, 2002 || Campo Imperatore || CINEOS || URS || align=right | 4.6 km || 
|-id=830 bgcolor=#fefefe
| 347830 ||  || — || August 6, 2002 || Palomar || NEAT || — || align=right data-sort-value="0.71" | 710 m || 
|-id=831 bgcolor=#E9E9E9
| 347831 ||  || — || August 11, 2002 || Palomar || NEAT || ADE || align=right | 2.8 km || 
|-id=832 bgcolor=#E9E9E9
| 347832 ||  || — || August 6, 2002 || Palomar || NEAT || — || align=right | 1.9 km || 
|-id=833 bgcolor=#E9E9E9
| 347833 ||  || — || July 9, 2002 || Socorro || LINEAR || — || align=right | 1.6 km || 
|-id=834 bgcolor=#d6d6d6
| 347834 ||  || — || August 12, 2002 || Socorro || LINEAR || 627 || align=right | 3.3 km || 
|-id=835 bgcolor=#fefefe
| 347835 ||  || — || August 14, 2002 || Socorro || LINEAR || — || align=right data-sort-value="0.70" | 700 m || 
|-id=836 bgcolor=#d6d6d6
| 347836 ||  || — || August 11, 2002 || Palomar || NEAT || EOS || align=right | 2.4 km || 
|-id=837 bgcolor=#E9E9E9
| 347837 ||  || — || August 13, 2002 || Palomar || NEAT || — || align=right | 2.8 km || 
|-id=838 bgcolor=#E9E9E9
| 347838 ||  || — || August 12, 2002 || Socorro || LINEAR || — || align=right | 2.3 km || 
|-id=839 bgcolor=#fefefe
| 347839 ||  || — || August 14, 2002 || Socorro || LINEAR || PHO || align=right | 1.3 km || 
|-id=840 bgcolor=#E9E9E9
| 347840 ||  || — || August 7, 2002 || Palomar || NEAT || — || align=right | 2.5 km || 
|-id=841 bgcolor=#E9E9E9
| 347841 ||  || — || August 15, 2002 || Palomar || NEAT || — || align=right | 1.7 km || 
|-id=842 bgcolor=#E9E9E9
| 347842 ||  || — || August 17, 2002 || Palomar || NEAT || — || align=right | 3.0 km || 
|-id=843 bgcolor=#E9E9E9
| 347843 ||  || — || August 26, 2002 || Palomar || NEAT || — || align=right | 1.3 km || 
|-id=844 bgcolor=#E9E9E9
| 347844 ||  || — || August 28, 2002 || Socorro || LINEAR || — || align=right | 3.5 km || 
|-id=845 bgcolor=#E9E9E9
| 347845 ||  || — || August 28, 2002 || Palomar || NEAT || — || align=right | 2.0 km || 
|-id=846 bgcolor=#E9E9E9
| 347846 ||  || — || August 18, 2002 || Palomar || NEAT || — || align=right | 2.1 km || 
|-id=847 bgcolor=#E9E9E9
| 347847 ||  || — || August 16, 2002 || Palomar || NEAT || — || align=right | 1.3 km || 
|-id=848 bgcolor=#E9E9E9
| 347848 ||  || — || August 16, 2002 || Palomar || NEAT || — || align=right | 2.6 km || 
|-id=849 bgcolor=#E9E9E9
| 347849 ||  || — || August 30, 2002 || Palomar || NEAT || — || align=right | 2.6 km || 
|-id=850 bgcolor=#E9E9E9
| 347850 ||  || — || August 18, 2002 || Palomar || NEAT || AGN || align=right | 1.3 km || 
|-id=851 bgcolor=#E9E9E9
| 347851 ||  || — || August 30, 2002 || Palomar || NEAT || — || align=right | 2.1 km || 
|-id=852 bgcolor=#E9E9E9
| 347852 ||  || — || August 30, 2002 || Palomar || NEAT || MRX || align=right | 1.2 km || 
|-id=853 bgcolor=#E9E9E9
| 347853 ||  || — || July 23, 2010 || WISE || WISE || PAD || align=right | 1.5 km || 
|-id=854 bgcolor=#E9E9E9
| 347854 ||  || — || October 8, 2007 || Calvin-Rehoboth || L. A. Molnar || DOR || align=right | 1.9 km || 
|-id=855 bgcolor=#E9E9E9
| 347855 ||  || — || September 4, 2002 || Anderson Mesa || LONEOS || CLO || align=right | 2.7 km || 
|-id=856 bgcolor=#E9E9E9
| 347856 ||  || — || September 5, 2002 || Socorro || LINEAR || DOR || align=right | 3.2 km || 
|-id=857 bgcolor=#E9E9E9
| 347857 ||  || — || September 5, 2002 || Socorro || LINEAR || — || align=right | 3.3 km || 
|-id=858 bgcolor=#E9E9E9
| 347858 ||  || — || September 8, 2002 || Haleakala || NEAT || — || align=right | 3.4 km || 
|-id=859 bgcolor=#fefefe
| 347859 ||  || — || September 12, 2002 || Essen || Walter Hohmann Obs. || H || align=right data-sort-value="0.78" | 780 m || 
|-id=860 bgcolor=#fefefe
| 347860 ||  || — || September 13, 2002 || Palomar || NEAT || — || align=right data-sort-value="0.64" | 640 m || 
|-id=861 bgcolor=#FA8072
| 347861 ||  || — || September 12, 2002 || Haleakala || NEAT || — || align=right data-sort-value="0.87" | 870 m || 
|-id=862 bgcolor=#E9E9E9
| 347862 ||  || — || September 13, 2002 || Socorro || LINEAR || — || align=right | 3.2 km || 
|-id=863 bgcolor=#fefefe
| 347863 ||  || — || September 13, 2002 || Socorro || LINEAR || FLO || align=right data-sort-value="0.64" | 640 m || 
|-id=864 bgcolor=#fefefe
| 347864 ||  || — || September 5, 2002 || Anderson Mesa || LONEOS || — || align=right data-sort-value="0.87" | 870 m || 
|-id=865 bgcolor=#E9E9E9
| 347865 ||  || — || September 11, 2002 || Palomar || M. White, M. Collins || HOF || align=right | 2.3 km || 
|-id=866 bgcolor=#E9E9E9
| 347866 ||  || — || September 15, 2002 || Palomar || R. Matson || HOF || align=right | 2.9 km || 
|-id=867 bgcolor=#E9E9E9
| 347867 ||  || — || September 14, 2002 || Palomar || R. Matson || — || align=right | 2.3 km || 
|-id=868 bgcolor=#fefefe
| 347868 ||  || — || September 14, 2002 || Palomar || NEAT || V || align=right data-sort-value="0.89" | 890 m || 
|-id=869 bgcolor=#E9E9E9
| 347869 ||  || — || September 1, 2002 || Palomar || NEAT || AGN || align=right | 1.2 km || 
|-id=870 bgcolor=#E9E9E9
| 347870 ||  || — || September 1, 2002 || Palomar || NEAT || — || align=right | 1.8 km || 
|-id=871 bgcolor=#E9E9E9
| 347871 ||  || — || September 10, 2002 || Palomar || NEAT || GEF || align=right | 1.4 km || 
|-id=872 bgcolor=#E9E9E9
| 347872 ||  || — || September 4, 2002 || Palomar || NEAT || — || align=right | 2.4 km || 
|-id=873 bgcolor=#E9E9E9
| 347873 ||  || — || September 17, 2002 || Palomar || NEAT || GEF || align=right | 1.7 km || 
|-id=874 bgcolor=#fefefe
| 347874 ||  || — || September 17, 2002 || Anderson Mesa || NEAT || — || align=right | 1.2 km || 
|-id=875 bgcolor=#E9E9E9
| 347875 ||  || — || October 2, 2002 || Socorro || LINEAR || — || align=right | 2.7 km || 
|-id=876 bgcolor=#d6d6d6
| 347876 ||  || — || October 2, 2002 || Socorro || LINEAR || HYG || align=right | 4.1 km || 
|-id=877 bgcolor=#E9E9E9
| 347877 ||  || — || October 2, 2002 || Socorro || LINEAR || — || align=right | 3.0 km || 
|-id=878 bgcolor=#d6d6d6
| 347878 ||  || — || October 2, 2002 || Socorro || LINEAR || EOS || align=right | 2.4 km || 
|-id=879 bgcolor=#FA8072
| 347879 ||  || — || October 3, 2002 || Palomar || NEAT || H || align=right data-sort-value="0.86" | 860 m || 
|-id=880 bgcolor=#E9E9E9
| 347880 ||  || — || October 2, 2002 || Haleakala || NEAT || — || align=right | 3.3 km || 
|-id=881 bgcolor=#fefefe
| 347881 ||  || — || October 2, 2002 || Haleakala || NEAT || H || align=right data-sort-value="0.87" | 870 m || 
|-id=882 bgcolor=#E9E9E9
| 347882 ||  || — || October 2, 2002 || Haleakala || NEAT || — || align=right | 3.1 km || 
|-id=883 bgcolor=#d6d6d6
| 347883 ||  || — || October 4, 2002 || Palomar || NEAT || YAK || align=right | 2.8 km || 
|-id=884 bgcolor=#d6d6d6
| 347884 ||  || — || October 5, 2002 || Palomar || NEAT || VER || align=right | 3.8 km || 
|-id=885 bgcolor=#E9E9E9
| 347885 ||  || — || October 3, 2002 || Palomar || NEAT || — || align=right | 4.1 km || 
|-id=886 bgcolor=#E9E9E9
| 347886 ||  || — || October 3, 2002 || Palomar || NEAT || — || align=right | 3.3 km || 
|-id=887 bgcolor=#FA8072
| 347887 ||  || — || October 4, 2002 || Socorro || LINEAR || — || align=right data-sort-value="0.72" | 720 m || 
|-id=888 bgcolor=#d6d6d6
| 347888 ||  || — || October 6, 2002 || Socorro || LINEAR || BRA || align=right | 1.7 km || 
|-id=889 bgcolor=#d6d6d6
| 347889 ||  || — || October 4, 2002 || Socorro || LINEAR || — || align=right | 2.9 km || 
|-id=890 bgcolor=#fefefe
| 347890 ||  || — || October 4, 2002 || Socorro || LINEAR || — || align=right data-sort-value="0.85" | 850 m || 
|-id=891 bgcolor=#E9E9E9
| 347891 ||  || — || October 5, 2002 || Socorro || LINEAR || — || align=right | 3.8 km || 
|-id=892 bgcolor=#fefefe
| 347892 ||  || — || October 5, 2002 || Socorro || LINEAR || — || align=right data-sort-value="0.95" | 950 m || 
|-id=893 bgcolor=#E9E9E9
| 347893 ||  || — || October 10, 2002 || Socorro || LINEAR || — || align=right | 3.2 km || 
|-id=894 bgcolor=#d6d6d6
| 347894 ||  || — || October 10, 2002 || Apache Point || SDSS || 615 || align=right | 1.4 km || 
|-id=895 bgcolor=#d6d6d6
| 347895 ||  || — || October 10, 2002 || Apache Point || SDSS || EOS || align=right | 2.2 km || 
|-id=896 bgcolor=#E9E9E9
| 347896 ||  || — || October 10, 2002 || Apache Point || SDSS || — || align=right | 3.1 km || 
|-id=897 bgcolor=#E9E9E9
| 347897 ||  || — || October 6, 2002 || Palomar || NEAT || — || align=right | 2.2 km || 
|-id=898 bgcolor=#fefefe
| 347898 ||  || — || October 30, 2002 || Palomar || NEAT || — || align=right data-sort-value="0.80" | 800 m || 
|-id=899 bgcolor=#fefefe
| 347899 ||  || — || October 30, 2002 || Palomar || NEAT || — || align=right data-sort-value="0.70" | 700 m || 
|-id=900 bgcolor=#FA8072
| 347900 ||  || — || November 1, 2002 || Palomar || NEAT || — || align=right data-sort-value="0.74" | 740 m || 
|}

347901–348000 

|-bgcolor=#E9E9E9
| 347901 ||  || — || November 4, 2002 || Wrightwood || J. W. Young || HOF || align=right | 3.6 km || 
|-id=902 bgcolor=#E9E9E9
| 347902 ||  || — || November 7, 2002 || Socorro || LINEAR || — || align=right | 3.0 km || 
|-id=903 bgcolor=#fefefe
| 347903 ||  || — || November 7, 2002 || Socorro || LINEAR || — || align=right data-sort-value="0.86" | 860 m || 
|-id=904 bgcolor=#fefefe
| 347904 ||  || — || November 15, 2002 || Palomar || NEAT || — || align=right data-sort-value="0.78" | 780 m || 
|-id=905 bgcolor=#fefefe
| 347905 ||  || — || November 6, 2002 || Socorro || LINEAR || H || align=right | 1.1 km || 
|-id=906 bgcolor=#fefefe
| 347906 ||  || — || November 19, 2009 || Mount Lemmon || Mount Lemmon Survey || — || align=right data-sort-value="0.64" | 640 m || 
|-id=907 bgcolor=#d6d6d6
| 347907 ||  || — || November 24, 2002 || Palomar || NEAT || KOR || align=right | 1.9 km || 
|-id=908 bgcolor=#fefefe
| 347908 ||  || — || December 1, 2002 || Socorro || LINEAR || — || align=right | 1.1 km || 
|-id=909 bgcolor=#fefefe
| 347909 ||  || — || December 5, 2002 || Socorro || LINEAR || FLO || align=right data-sort-value="0.71" | 710 m || 
|-id=910 bgcolor=#FA8072
| 347910 ||  || — || December 10, 2002 || Socorro || LINEAR || — || align=right | 1.3 km || 
|-id=911 bgcolor=#d6d6d6
| 347911 ||  || — || December 3, 2002 || Palomar || NEAT || — || align=right | 2.4 km || 
|-id=912 bgcolor=#d6d6d6
| 347912 ||  || — || December 31, 2002 || Socorro || LINEAR || — || align=right | 3.1 km || 
|-id=913 bgcolor=#fefefe
| 347913 ||  || — || December 31, 2002 || Socorro || LINEAR || FLO || align=right data-sort-value="0.71" | 710 m || 
|-id=914 bgcolor=#fefefe
| 347914 ||  || — || January 1, 2003 || Socorro || LINEAR || H || align=right | 1.2 km || 
|-id=915 bgcolor=#d6d6d6
| 347915 ||  || — || January 5, 2003 || Socorro || LINEAR || — || align=right | 4.1 km || 
|-id=916 bgcolor=#fefefe
| 347916 ||  || — || January 28, 2003 || Kitt Peak || Spacewatch || — || align=right data-sort-value="0.73" | 730 m || 
|-id=917 bgcolor=#d6d6d6
| 347917 ||  || — || December 28, 2002 || Kitt Peak || Spacewatch || — || align=right | 3.3 km || 
|-id=918 bgcolor=#fefefe
| 347918 ||  || — || January 27, 2003 || Palomar || NEAT || — || align=right | 1.2 km || 
|-id=919 bgcolor=#E9E9E9
| 347919 ||  || — || January 29, 2003 || Palomar || NEAT || — || align=right | 1.5 km || 
|-id=920 bgcolor=#fefefe
| 347920 ||  || — || January 24, 2003 || Pla D'Arguines || R. Ferrando || FLO || align=right data-sort-value="0.96" | 960 m || 
|-id=921 bgcolor=#fefefe
| 347921 ||  || — || January 31, 2003 || Kitt Peak || Spacewatch || — || align=right | 1.2 km || 
|-id=922 bgcolor=#d6d6d6
| 347922 ||  || — || January 29, 2003 || Palomar || NEAT || — || align=right | 3.8 km || 
|-id=923 bgcolor=#d6d6d6
| 347923 ||  || — || January 31, 2003 || Socorro || LINEAR || — || align=right | 4.7 km || 
|-id=924 bgcolor=#d6d6d6
| 347924 ||  || — || February 9, 2003 || Palomar || NEAT || — || align=right | 4.3 km || 
|-id=925 bgcolor=#E9E9E9
| 347925 ||  || — || January 28, 2003 || Palomar || NEAT || ADE || align=right | 2.5 km || 
|-id=926 bgcolor=#d6d6d6
| 347926 ||  || — || February 7, 2003 || Desert Eagle || W. K. Y. Yeung || — || align=right | 3.1 km || 
|-id=927 bgcolor=#fefefe
| 347927 ||  || — || February 26, 2003 || Campo Imperatore || CINEOS || FLO || align=right | 1.6 km || 
|-id=928 bgcolor=#fefefe
| 347928 ||  || — || March 3, 2003 || Socorro || LINEAR || PHO || align=right | 1.2 km || 
|-id=929 bgcolor=#fefefe
| 347929 ||  || — || March 6, 2003 || Socorro || LINEAR || — || align=right data-sort-value="0.86" | 860 m || 
|-id=930 bgcolor=#fefefe
| 347930 ||  || — || March 6, 2003 || Anderson Mesa || LONEOS || NYS || align=right data-sort-value="0.79" | 790 m || 
|-id=931 bgcolor=#d6d6d6
| 347931 ||  || — || March 8, 2003 || Palomar || NEAT || — || align=right | 3.8 km || 
|-id=932 bgcolor=#d6d6d6
| 347932 ||  || — || March 25, 2003 || Wrightwood || J. W. Young || — || align=right | 3.5 km || 
|-id=933 bgcolor=#d6d6d6
| 347933 ||  || — || March 26, 2003 || Palomar || NEAT || — || align=right | 3.4 km || 
|-id=934 bgcolor=#d6d6d6
| 347934 ||  || — || March 26, 2003 || Palomar || NEAT || — || align=right | 3.8 km || 
|-id=935 bgcolor=#d6d6d6
| 347935 ||  || — || March 26, 2003 || Palomar || NEAT || — || align=right | 2.8 km || 
|-id=936 bgcolor=#d6d6d6
| 347936 ||  || — || March 26, 2003 || Palomar || NEAT || — || align=right | 3.7 km || 
|-id=937 bgcolor=#fefefe
| 347937 ||  || — || March 28, 2003 || Anderson Mesa || LONEOS || — || align=right | 1.2 km || 
|-id=938 bgcolor=#fefefe
| 347938 ||  || — || March 29, 2003 || Anderson Mesa || LONEOS || ERI || align=right | 2.2 km || 
|-id=939 bgcolor=#fefefe
| 347939 ||  || — || March 30, 2003 || Socorro || LINEAR || NYS || align=right data-sort-value="0.90" | 900 m || 
|-id=940 bgcolor=#d6d6d6
| 347940 Jorgezuluaga ||  ||  || March 30, 2003 || Mérida || I. R. Ferrín, C. Leal || — || align=right | 3.2 km || 
|-id=941 bgcolor=#fefefe
| 347941 ||  || — || March 26, 2003 || Kitt Peak || Spacewatch || — || align=right data-sort-value="0.94" | 940 m || 
|-id=942 bgcolor=#fefefe
| 347942 ||  || — || April 3, 2003 || Socorro || LINEAR || KLI || align=right | 2.1 km || 
|-id=943 bgcolor=#C2FFFF
| 347943 ||  || — || April 9, 2003 || Kitt Peak || Spacewatch || L4 || align=right | 13 km || 
|-id=944 bgcolor=#fefefe
| 347944 ||  || — || April 25, 2003 || Anderson Mesa || LONEOS || V || align=right data-sort-value="0.78" | 780 m || 
|-id=945 bgcolor=#fefefe
| 347945 ||  || — || April 25, 2003 || Kitt Peak || Spacewatch || — || align=right data-sort-value="0.74" | 740 m || 
|-id=946 bgcolor=#d6d6d6
| 347946 ||  || — || April 25, 2003 || Kitt Peak || Spacewatch || — || align=right | 3.0 km || 
|-id=947 bgcolor=#fefefe
| 347947 ||  || — || June 1, 2003 || Kitt Peak || Spacewatch || H || align=right | 1.1 km || 
|-id=948 bgcolor=#E9E9E9
| 347948 ||  || — || June 26, 2003 || Socorro || LINEAR || — || align=right | 3.9 km || 
|-id=949 bgcolor=#E9E9E9
| 347949 ||  || — || July 23, 2003 || Palomar || NEAT || JUN || align=right | 1.2 km || 
|-id=950 bgcolor=#E9E9E9
| 347950 ||  || — || July 24, 2003 || Palomar || NEAT || — || align=right | 1.7 km || 
|-id=951 bgcolor=#E9E9E9
| 347951 ||  || — || July 24, 2003 || Palomar || NEAT || ADE || align=right | 2.7 km || 
|-id=952 bgcolor=#E9E9E9
| 347952 ||  || — || August 2, 2003 || Reedy Creek || J. Broughton || — || align=right | 1.5 km || 
|-id=953 bgcolor=#E9E9E9
| 347953 ||  || — || August 18, 2003 || Campo Imperatore || CINEOS || — || align=right | 1.1 km || 
|-id=954 bgcolor=#E9E9E9
| 347954 ||  || — || August 21, 2003 || Palomar || NEAT || EUN || align=right | 1.6 km || 
|-id=955 bgcolor=#fefefe
| 347955 ||  || — || July 25, 2003 || Palomar || NEAT || — || align=right data-sort-value="0.91" | 910 m || 
|-id=956 bgcolor=#fefefe
| 347956 ||  || — || August 23, 2003 || Socorro || LINEAR || — || align=right data-sort-value="0.89" | 890 m || 
|-id=957 bgcolor=#d6d6d6
| 347957 ||  || — || August 24, 2003 || Socorro || LINEAR || — || align=right | 5.5 km || 
|-id=958 bgcolor=#E9E9E9
| 347958 ||  || — || August 26, 2003 || Črni Vrh || Črni Vrh || — || align=right | 1.7 km || 
|-id=959 bgcolor=#E9E9E9
| 347959 ||  || — || August 28, 2003 || Palomar || NEAT || — || align=right data-sort-value="0.98" | 980 m || 
|-id=960 bgcolor=#fefefe
| 347960 ||  || — || August 25, 2003 || Socorro || LINEAR || ERI || align=right | 1.9 km || 
|-id=961 bgcolor=#FA8072
| 347961 ||  || — || August 29, 2003 || Haleakala || NEAT || — || align=right | 2.4 km || 
|-id=962 bgcolor=#fefefe
| 347962 ||  || — || September 3, 2003 || Essen || Walter Hohmann Obs. || — || align=right data-sort-value="0.90" | 900 m || 
|-id=963 bgcolor=#E9E9E9
| 347963 ||  || — || September 4, 2003 || Socorro || LINEAR || — || align=right | 2.4 km || 
|-id=964 bgcolor=#E9E9E9
| 347964 ||  || — || September 5, 2003 || Socorro || LINEAR || JUN || align=right | 1.6 km || 
|-id=965 bgcolor=#E9E9E9
| 347965 ||  || — || September 1, 2003 || Socorro || LINEAR || — || align=right | 1.9 km || 
|-id=966 bgcolor=#E9E9E9
| 347966 ||  || — || September 15, 2003 || Anderson Mesa || LONEOS || — || align=right | 1.7 km || 
|-id=967 bgcolor=#E9E9E9
| 347967 ||  || — || September 17, 2003 || Kitt Peak || Spacewatch || MIS || align=right | 2.4 km || 
|-id=968 bgcolor=#fefefe
| 347968 ||  || — || September 18, 2003 || Kitt Peak || Spacewatch || — || align=right data-sort-value="0.89" | 890 m || 
|-id=969 bgcolor=#d6d6d6
| 347969 ||  || — || September 16, 2003 || Anderson Mesa || LONEOS || Tj (2.95) || align=right | 4.2 km || 
|-id=970 bgcolor=#d6d6d6
| 347970 ||  || — || September 16, 2003 || Anderson Mesa || LONEOS || — || align=right | 4.0 km || 
|-id=971 bgcolor=#E9E9E9
| 347971 ||  || — || September 16, 2003 || Anderson Mesa || LONEOS || — || align=right | 2.1 km || 
|-id=972 bgcolor=#E9E9E9
| 347972 ||  || — || September 16, 2003 || Anderson Mesa || LONEOS || ADE || align=right | 3.5 km || 
|-id=973 bgcolor=#d6d6d6
| 347973 ||  || — || September 17, 2003 || Kitt Peak || Spacewatch || — || align=right | 3.9 km || 
|-id=974 bgcolor=#E9E9E9
| 347974 ||  || — || September 17, 2003 || Socorro || LINEAR || JUN || align=right | 1.1 km || 
|-id=975 bgcolor=#E9E9E9
| 347975 ||  || — || September 17, 2003 || Socorro || LINEAR || JUN || align=right | 1.3 km || 
|-id=976 bgcolor=#E9E9E9
| 347976 ||  || — || September 17, 2003 || Kitt Peak || Spacewatch || fast? || align=right | 1.8 km || 
|-id=977 bgcolor=#E9E9E9
| 347977 ||  || — || September 19, 2003 || Haleakala || NEAT || — || align=right | 2.1 km || 
|-id=978 bgcolor=#E9E9E9
| 347978 ||  || — || September 17, 2003 || Socorro || LINEAR || — || align=right | 1.2 km || 
|-id=979 bgcolor=#E9E9E9
| 347979 ||  || — || September 18, 2003 || Socorro || LINEAR || — || align=right | 2.5 km || 
|-id=980 bgcolor=#E9E9E9
| 347980 ||  || — || September 18, 2003 || Palomar || NEAT || IANfast? || align=right data-sort-value="0.87" | 870 m || 
|-id=981 bgcolor=#fefefe
| 347981 ||  || — || September 19, 2003 || Palomar || NEAT || — || align=right | 1.1 km || 
|-id=982 bgcolor=#E9E9E9
| 347982 ||  || — || September 19, 2003 || Kitt Peak || Spacewatch || — || align=right | 1.5 km || 
|-id=983 bgcolor=#E9E9E9
| 347983 ||  || — || September 19, 2003 || Haleakala || NEAT || — || align=right | 3.5 km || 
|-id=984 bgcolor=#fefefe
| 347984 ||  || — || September 20, 2003 || Palomar || NEAT || V || align=right | 1.0 km || 
|-id=985 bgcolor=#E9E9E9
| 347985 ||  || — || September 19, 2003 || Anderson Mesa || LONEOS || — || align=right | 2.8 km || 
|-id=986 bgcolor=#E9E9E9
| 347986 ||  || — || September 16, 2003 || Socorro || LINEAR || RAF || align=right | 1.2 km || 
|-id=987 bgcolor=#E9E9E9
| 347987 ||  || — || September 16, 2003 || Palomar || NEAT || — || align=right | 1.7 km || 
|-id=988 bgcolor=#E9E9E9
| 347988 ||  || — || September 18, 2003 || Palomar || NEAT || — || align=right | 1.7 km || 
|-id=989 bgcolor=#E9E9E9
| 347989 ||  || — || September 18, 2003 || Palomar || NEAT || — || align=right | 1.3 km || 
|-id=990 bgcolor=#fefefe
| 347990 ||  || — || September 19, 2003 || Campo Imperatore || CINEOS || NYS || align=right data-sort-value="0.80" | 800 m || 
|-id=991 bgcolor=#E9E9E9
| 347991 ||  || — || September 19, 2003 || Palomar || NEAT || ADE || align=right | 2.2 km || 
|-id=992 bgcolor=#fefefe
| 347992 ||  || — || September 16, 2003 || Socorro || LINEAR || FLO || align=right | 1.1 km || 
|-id=993 bgcolor=#E9E9E9
| 347993 ||  || — || September 20, 2003 || Anderson Mesa || LONEOS || — || align=right | 2.1 km || 
|-id=994 bgcolor=#E9E9E9
| 347994 ||  || — || September 20, 2003 || Anderson Mesa || LONEOS || — || align=right | 3.4 km || 
|-id=995 bgcolor=#E9E9E9
| 347995 ||  || — || September 19, 2003 || Palomar || NEAT || — || align=right | 1.2 km || 
|-id=996 bgcolor=#E9E9E9
| 347996 ||  || — || September 20, 2003 || Palomar || NEAT || — || align=right | 1.4 km || 
|-id=997 bgcolor=#E9E9E9
| 347997 ||  || — || September 26, 2003 || Socorro || LINEAR || — || align=right | 1.8 km || 
|-id=998 bgcolor=#E9E9E9
| 347998 ||  || — || September 24, 2003 || Palomar || NEAT || JUN || align=right | 1.2 km || 
|-id=999 bgcolor=#E9E9E9
| 347999 ||  || — || September 20, 2003 || Kitt Peak || Spacewatch || — || align=right | 1.6 km || 
|-id=000 bgcolor=#fefefe
| 348000 ||  || — || September 26, 2003 || Socorro || LINEAR || — || align=right data-sort-value="0.81" | 810 m || 
|}

References

External links 
 Discovery Circumstances: Numbered Minor Planets (345001)–(350000) (IAU Minor Planet Center)

0347